= Borosulfate =

Class of chemical compounds

The borosulfates are heteropoly anion compounds which have sulfate groups attached to boron atoms. Other possible terms are sulfatoborates or boron-sulfur oxides. The ratio of sulfate to borate reflects the degree of condensation. With [B(SO_{4})_{4}]^{5-} there is no condensation, each ion stands alone. In [B(SO_{4})_{3}]^{3-} the anions are linked into a chain, a chain of loops, or as [B_{2}(SO_{4})_{6}]^{6−} in a cycle. Finally in [B(SO_{4})_{2}]^{−} the sulfate and borate tetrahedra are all linked into a two or three-dimensional network. These arrangements of oxygen around boron and sulfur can have forms resembling silicates. The first borosulfate to be discovered was K_{5}[B(SO_{4})_{4}] in 2012 by the research group of Henning Höppe, although the compound class as such had been postulated already in 1962 by G. Schott and H. U. Kibbel. Over 80 unique compounds are known as of 2024.

They are distinct from the borate sulfates which have separate, uncondensed sulfate and borate ions.

Related compounds include boroselenates, borotellurates, and also boroantimonates, borogallates, borogermanates, borophosphates, boroselenites and borosilicates.

== Formation ==
Borosulfates are formed by heating boric oxide, oleum, or sulfuric acid, with metal carbonates. The degree of condensation is varied with the ratio of oleum to sulfuric acid. Pure oleum is more likely to yield compounds with disulfate groups.

== Reactions ==
When heated to around 500 °C the borosulfates decompose by emitting SO_{3} vapour and form a metal sulfate and boric oxide.

== List ==
	chem	mw	crystal system	space group	unit cell Å	volume	density	comment	references
boron sulfate	B_{2}S_{2}O_{9}	229.74	monoclinic	C2	a=7.7600, b=4.1664, c=8.6134; β=94.785°; Z=2	277.51	2.749	no cations; 3D mesh	
	H[B(HSO_{4})_{4}]							superacid	
	H_{3}O[B(SO_{4})_{2}]			P4/ncc	a=9.1377, c=7.3423; Z=4				
	H[B(SO_{4})(S_{2}O_{7})]		monoclinic	P2_{1}/c	a=15.697, b=11.4362, c=8.5557; β=90.334°				
	Li[B(SO_{4})_{2}]			Pc	a=7.635, b=9.342, c=8.432; β=92.55°			3D network, like tectosilicate	
	Li[B(S_{2}O_{7})_{2}]		orthorhombic	P2_{1}2_{1}2_{1}	a=10.862, b=10.877, c=17.769				
	Li_{5}[B(SO_{4})_{4}]		orthorhombic	P2_{1}/c	a=8.0191, b=10.2111, c=15.0401				
	Be[B_{2}(SO_{4})_{4}]		monoclinic	C2/c	a=23.856, b=7.3507, c=12.3235; β=98.724(2)°; Z=8	2136.1	2.58	colourless	
	NH_{4}[B(SO_{4})_{2}]			P4/ncc	a=9.1980, c=7.2458			decomposes at 320 °C (608 °F), proton conductor	
	NH_{4}[B(S_{2}O_{7})_{2}]		monoclinic	Cc	a=11.4403, b=14.9439, c=13.8693; β=93.662°				
	(NH_{4})_{2}B_{4}SO_{10}	271.38	monoclinic	C2	a=11.3685, b=6.5541, c=12.8328; β=106.247°; Z=4	918.0	1.964	SHG 1.1 × KDP; min PM wavelength 252 nm; decompose 300 °C; UV edge 184 nm	
	(NH_{4})_{3}H_{2}[BOB(PO_{4})_{3}]		monoclinic	P2_{1}/c	a=7.7506, b=6.6685, c=24.355; β=92.562°; Z=4	1257.5	2.000	white	
	[NH_{4}]_{3}[B(SO_{4})_{3}]	343.12	orthorhombic	Ibca	a=7.2858, b=14.7048, c=22.7052; Z=8	2433.2	1.928	decomposes 320 °C (608 °F) chains	
nitrosonium	(NO)[B(S_{2}O_{7})_{2}]		monoclinic	Cc	a = 11.3824 b = 14.6067 c = 13.6858 β = 95.128° Z=8			band gap 4.3 eV	
nitrosonium	(NO)[B(SO_{4})_{2}]		orthorhombic	Pccn	a = 9.0046 b = 9.0780 c = 7.4462 Z=4			band gap 4.1 eV	
	Na[B(SO_{4})_{2}]		monoclinic	P2/c	a=5.434, b=7.570, c=7.766; β=99.74°				
	Na[B(S_{2}O_{7})_{2}]		monoclinic	P2_{1}/c	a=10.949, b=8.49, c=12.701; β=110.227°; Z=4				
	Na_{2}B_{6}SO_{13}		orthorhombic	Pbca	a=11.6569, b=9.4094, c=17.4833; Z=8	1917.6	2.431	birefringence Δn = 0.07 @ 589.3 nm	
	Na_{3}B_{3}S_{2}O_{11}(OH)_{2}		triclinic	P1̅	a=6.5282 b=6.6711 c=12.0045 α=93.927° β=99.502° γ=94.278°				
	Na_{5}[B(SO_{4})_{4}]^{−I}		orthorhombic	Pca2_{1}	a=10.730, b=13.891, c=18.197				
	Na_{5}[B(SO_{4})_{4}]^{−II}		orthorhombic	P2_{1}2_{1}2_{1}	a=8.624, b=9.275, c=16.671				
	Na_{5}[BOB(PO_{4})_{3}]							white	
	Li_{2}NaB_{3}S_{2}O_{12}		monoclinic	P2_{1}/c	a=11.6720 b=8.2574 c=9.6126 β=97.940°			birefringence 0.057 at 546.1 nm; UV edge 184 nm	
	α-Mg_{4}[B_{2}O(SO_{4})_{6}]	711.22	trigonal	P3̅	a=8.0165 c=7.4858 Z=1	416.62	2.835	colourless	
	β-Mg_{4}[B_{2}O(SO_{4})_{6}]	711.22	hexagonal	P3̅	a = 13.9196, c = 7.4854, Z = 3	1253	2.821	colourless	
	Mg[B_{2}(SO_{4})_{4}]	430.17	monoclinic	C2/c	a=17.443, b=5.3145, c=14.2906; β=126.323°; Z=4	1067.3	2.677	phyllosilicate structure colourless decomposes 550 °C (1,022 °F)	
	β-Mg[B_{2}(SO_{4})_{4}]		monoclinic	P2_{1}/n	a=7.9100, b=8.0815, c=9.0376; β=111.37°; Z=2	269.01	2.667	colourless decomposes 550 °C (1,022 °F)	
	Mg_{3}((H_{2}O)B(SO_{4})_{3})_{2}	706.94	triclinic	P1̅	a=7.9609, b=7.9671, c=9.2343; α=64.959°, β=89.228°, γ=60.054°	444.96	2.638	200K	
	Mg_{3}((H_{2}O)B(SO_{4})_{3})_{2}	706.94		R3̅	a=7.9620, c=24.4231; Z=3	1340.84	2.627	room temperature	
	K[B(SO_{4})_{2}]			P4/ncc	a=8.9739 c=7.4114				
	K[B(S_{2}O_{7})_{2}]		monoclinic	Cc	a=11.3368, b=14.66, c=13.6650; β=94.235°; Z=8				
	K_{2}B_{4}SO_{10}	313.50	monoclinic	C2	a=11.2631, b=6.4339, c=12.649; β=105.707°; Z=4	882.4	2.360	colourless; UV edge 182 nm	
	K_{3}B_{3}S_{2}O_{11}(OH)_{2}		triclinic	P1̅	a=7.0282 b=7.1559 c=12.3096 α=89.423° β=79.065° γ=86.344°				
pentapotassium borosulfate	K_{5}[B(SO_{4})_{4}]			P4_{1}	a=9.9023, c=16.1871	1687.2	2.471	first discovered	
	K_{4}[B(SO_{4})_{3}(HSO_{4})]			I2/a	a=14.524, b=7.3916, c=15.78.57, β=115.499°	1529.6	2.399		
	K_{3}[B(SO_{4})_{3}]		orthorhombic	Ibca	a = 7.074, b = 14.266, c = 22.58				
	K_{4}[BS_{4}O_{15}(OH)]		monoclinic	I2/a	a=14.524 b=7.3916 c=15.7857 β=115.50				
	K[B(SO_{3}Cl)_{4}]		triclinic	P1	a=10.513 b=10.838 c=10.965 α=99.21° β=135.48° γ=97.15° Z=2			chlorosulfate; moisture sensitive	
	Na_{4}KB(SO_{4})_{4}		triclinic	P1̅	a=6.993 b=12.124 c=15.950 α=88.549° β=86.823° γ=89.609°				
	CaB_{2}S_{4}O_{16}		monoclinic	P2_{1}/c	a=5.5188, b=15.1288, c=13.2660; β=92.88°			sheet	
	Mn[B_{2}(SO_{4})_{4}]		monoclinic	P2_{1}/n	a=8.0435, b=7.9174, c=9.3082; β=110.94° Z=2	553.63		colourless	
	α-Mn_{4}[B_{2}O(SO_{4})_{6}]	833.74	trigonal	P3̅	a=8.1086, c=7.7509; Z=1	441.3	3.137	colourless	
	β-Mn_{4}[B_{2}O(SO_{4})_{6}]	833.74	trigonal	P3̅	a=13.9196 c=7.4854				
	α-Co_{4}[B_{2}O(SO_{4})_{6}]		monoclinic	C2/c	a=17.4254, b=5.3397, c=14.3214; β=126.03°; Z=4	269.40	2.860	pink	
	β-Co_{4}[B_{2}O(SO_{4})_{6}]		monoclinic	P2_{1}/n	a=7.8892, b=8.1042, c= 9.0409; β=111.29°; Z=2	269.29	2.803	pink	
	α-Co_{4}[B_{2}O(SO_{4})_{6}]	849.70	trigonal	P3̅	a=7.991, c=7.669; Z=1	418.0	3.376	pink	
	α-Ni_{4}[B_{2}O(SO_{4})_{6}]	848.82	trigonal	P3̅	a=7.9359 c=7.4398 Z=1	405.77	3.474	yellow	
	Cu[B(SO_{4})_{2}(HSO_{4})]		triclinic	P1̅	a=5.3096, b=7.0752, c=11.1977; α=81.154°, β=80.302°, γ=80.897°			cyclic	
	Cu[B_{2}(SO_{4})_{4}]		triclinic	P1̅	a=5.2470, b=7.1371, c=7.9222; α=73.814°, β=70.692°, γ=86.642°			chain	
	Zn[B_{2}(SO_{4})_{4}]		monoclinic	P2_{1}/n	a=8.0435, b=7.9174, c=9.3082; β=111.26°; Z=2	534.36		colourless	
	α-Zn_{4}[B_{2}O(SO_{4})_{6}]	875.46	trigonal	P3̅	a=7.9971, c=7.4895; Z=1	414.81	3.505	colourless	
	Rb[B(SO_{4})_{2}]		tetragonal	P4/ncc	a = 9.1823 c = 7.4559 Z = 4	628.64	3.05		
	Rb_{2}B_{4}SO_{10}	406.24	monoclinic	C2	a=11.3127, b=6.5152, c=12.971; β=105.411°; Z=4	921.6	2.928	colourless; UV edge 190 nm	
	Rb_{3}[B(SO_{4})_{3}]		orthorhombic	Ibca	a=7.2759, b=14.794, c=22.637				
	Rb_{4}[B_{2}O(SO_{4})_{4}]		orthorhombic	Pnma	a=8.0415, b=10.647, c=20.425				
	Rb_{5}[B(SO_{4})_{4}]		tetragonal	P4_{3}2_{1}2	a=10.148, c=16.689; Z=4			band gap 3.99 eV	
	Rb_{3}HB_{4}S_{2}O_{14}			P6_{3}/m	a=6.502, c=19.02; Z=2				
	Rb_{3}H_{2}[BOB(PO_{4})_{3}]							white	
	LiRb_{4}[B(SO_{4})_{4}]	743.8	monoclinic	P2_{1}	a=7.5551, c=14.560, c=7.5517; β=90.2372°; Z=2			transparent	
	LiRb_{4}[B(SO_{4})_{4}]	743.8	tetragonal	I4̅	a=7.6128, c=14.631; Z=2			at 500K; SHG 1.1 × KDP	
	Na_{4}RbB(SO_{4})_{4}		monoclinic	P2_{1}/n	a=7.0493 b=12.171 c=16.011 β=93.707°				
	Sr[B_{2}(SO_{4})_{4}]	493.48	orthorhombic	Pnma	a=12.574, b=12.421, c=7.319; Z=4	1143.1	2.867	decomposes 400 °C (752 °F)	
	Sr[B_{2}(SO_{4})_{3}(S_{2}O_{7})]	573.54	monoclinic	P2_{1}/n	a=7.470, b=15.334, c=12.220; β=93.29°; Z=4	1397.5	2.726		
	Sr[B_{2}O(SO_{4})_{3}]		orthorhombic	Pnma	a=1657.3, b=12.037, c=4.39484				
	Sr[B_{3}O(SO_{4})_{4}(SO_{4}H)]	617.36	monoclinic	P2_{1}/c	a=11.3309, b=7.1482, c=19.355; β=106.878°; Z=4	1500.1	2.73	colourless; Sr in 9 coordination by sulfate oxygens	
	Y_{2}[B_{2}(SO_{4})_{6}]		monoclinic	C2/c	a=13.5172, b=11.3941, c=10.8994; β=93.447°			cyclic	
	Pd[B(S_{2}O_{7})_{2}]_{2}		monoclinic	P2_{1}/c	a=7.2686, b=12.7802, c=11.4930; β=101.343°; Z=2	1046.8	2.64	blue	
	Pd[B(S_{2}O_{7})_{2}]_{2}		tetragonal	P4_{1}	a=13.8210, c=21.724; Z=8	4149.7	2.66	blue	
	Pd[B(SO_{4})(S_{2}O_{7})]_{2}		monoclinic	P2_{1}/c	a = 6.7061 b = 16.0198 c = 8.1681 β = 94.923° Z = 2	874.27	2.55	red	
	Ag[B(SO_{4})_{2}]			P4/ncc	a=8.6679 c=7.2897				
	Ag[B(S_{2}O_{7})_{2}]		monoclinic	P2_{1}/c	a = 9.507, b = 9.601, c = 11.730, β = 98.35° Z=4	1059.3	2.953	colourless	
	Cd[B_{2}(SO_{4})_{4}]								
	Cd[B_{2}O(SO_{4})_{3}]	438.20	orthorhombic	Pnma	a=8.9692 b=11.520 c=8.7275 Z=4	901.8	3.23	colourless	
	Cd_{4}[B_{2}O(SO_{4})_{6}]		trigonal	P3̅	a=8.2222 c=7.9788 Z=1	467.14	3.78	colourless	
	LiSb[B(SO_{4})_{2}]_{4}		tetragonal	I4̅	a=11.7805 c=8.1027 Z=2	1124.49	2.777		
	NH_{4}Sb[B(SO_{4})_{2}]_{4}		monoclinic	C2	a=16.6782 b=8.1140 c=11.8248 β=134.8°	1135.6	2.78		
	NOSb[B(SO_{4})_{2}]_{4}		monoclinic	C2	a=16.6672 b=8.1228 c=11.7741 β=134.8° Z=2	1130.21	2.83		
	NaSb[B(SO_{4})_{2}]_{4}		tetragonal	I4̅	a=11.7889 c=8.1190 Z=2	1128.36	2.815		
	KSb[B(SO_{4})_{2}]_{4}		monoclinic	C2	a=16.619 b=8.122 c=11.723 β=134.55° Z=2	1127.6	2.865		
	RbSb[B(SO_{4})_{2}]_{4}		monoclinic	C2	a=16.6673 b=8.1124 c=11.8308 β=134.7° Z=2	1136.45	2.978		
	AgSb[B(SO_{4})_{2}]_{4}		tetragonal	P4̅	a=11.7994 c=8.1323 Z=2	1132.23	3.05		
	(I_{4})[B(S_{2}O_{7})_{2}]_{2}		triclinic	P1̅	a = 11.3714 b = 11.5509 c = 12.7811 α = 68.638° β = 68.275° γ = 64.626° Z=2	1366.16	2.999	orange-brown	
	Cs_{2}B_{4}SO_{10}	501.12	monoclinic	C2	a=11.4012 b=6.5997 c=13.5702 β=103.934° Z=4	919.04	3.359	colourless; UV edge 189 nm	
	Cs_{2}[B_{2}O(SO_{4})_{3}]		monoclinic	P2/c	a=14.765 b=6.710 c=12.528 β=104.50				
	Cs_{3}HB_{4}S_{2}O_{14}			P6_{3}/m	a = 6.5648, c = 19.5669 Z=2				
	Cs_{3}H_{2}[BOB(PO_{4})_{3}]		monoclinic	P2_{1}/c	a=8.2436 b=6.7387 c=24.414 β=92.713° Z=4	1354.7	3.538	proton conductor	
	Cs[B(SO_{4})(S_{2}O_{7})]		monoclinic	P2_{1}/c	a=10.4525, b=11.319, c=8.2760; β=103.206; Z=4				
	Cs_{3}Li_{2}[B(SO_{4})_{4}]		monoclinic	P2_{1}/n	a=13.7698 c=8.2376 c=13.9066 β=91.778				
	Na_{3}Cs_{2}B(SO_{4})_{4}		monoclinic	P2_{1}/n	a=13.7654 b=8.2281 c=13.9021 β=91.741°				
	Cs_{3}Na_{2}[B(SO_{4})_{4}]		monoclinic	P2_{1}/c	a=13.6406 b=7.9475 c=13.9573 β=990.781				
	CsK_{4}[B(SO_{4})_{4}]			P4_{3}2_{1}2	a=9.9433 c=16.881				
	CsSb[B(SO_{4})_{2}]_{4}		tetragonal	P4̅	a=11.916 c=8.0845 Z=2	1147.98	3.085		
	Ba[B_{2}(SO_{4})_{4}]		orthorhombic	Pnna	a = 12.791, b = 12.800, c = 7.317 Z = 4				
	Ba[B_{2}O(SO_{4})_{3}]		orthorhombic	Pnma	a=17.1848 b=12.3805 c=4.4226				
	Ba[B(S_{2}O_{7})_{2}]_{2}		monoclinic	I2/a	a = 11.6077, b = 8.9144, c = 21.303, β = 104.034° Z = 4			chains	
	La_{2}[B_{2}(SO_{4})_{6}]		monoclinic	C2/c	a=1379.2 b=1158.9 c=1139.5 β=93.611			cyclic	
	Ce_{2}[B_{2}(SO_{4})_{6}]		monoclinic	C2/c	13.740 b=11.5371 c=11.3057 β=93.661			cyclic	
	Pr_{2}[B_{2}(SO_{4})_{6}]		monoclinic	C2/c	a=13.711 b=11.5305 c=11.2643 β=93.668			cyclic	
	Nd_{2}[B_{2}(SO_{4})_{6}]		monoclinic	C2/c	a=13.6775 b=11.51.34 11.2046 β=93.5909			cyclic	
	Sm_{2}[B_{2}(SO_{4})_{6}]		monoclinic	C2/c	a=13.633 b=11.492 c=11.112 β=93.567			cyclic	
	Eu_{2}[B_{2}(SO_{4})_{6}]		monoclinic	C2/c	a=13.602 b=11.470 c=11.050 β=93.465			cyclic	
	Gd_{2}[B_{2}(SO_{4})_{6}]		monoclinic	C2/c	a=13.5697 b=11.4426 c=11.0271 β=			cyclic	
	Tb_{2}[B_{2}(SO_{4})_{6}]		monoclinic	C2/c	a=13.5601 b=11.42.48 c=10.9881 β=93.534			cyclic	
	Dy_{2}[B_{2}(SO_{4})_{6}]		monoclinic	C2/c	a=13.568 b=11.425 c=10.9703 β=93.540			cyclic	
	Ho_{2}[B_{2}(SO_{4})_{6}]		monoclinic	C2/c	a=13.505 b=11.409 c=10.921 β=93.453			cyclic	
	Er_{2}[B_{2}(SO_{4})_{6}]		monoclinic	C2/c	a=13.551 b=11.411 c=10.882 β=93.41			cyclic	
	Tm_{2}[B_{2}(SO_{4})_{6}]		monoclinic	C2/c	a=13.4981 b=11.3617 10.8327 β=93.4500			cyclic	
	Yb_{2}[B_{2}(SO_{4})_{6}]		monoclinic	C2/c	a=13.495 b=11.3452 c=10.7961 β=93.390			cyclic	
	Lu_{2}[B_{2}(SO_{4})_{6}]		monoclinic	C2/c	a=13.469 b=11.364 c=10.799 β=93.369			cyclic	
	LiLu[B(SO_{4})_{2}]_{4}		tetragonal	I4̅	a=11.7160 c=8.0395 Z=2	1103.54	2.990		
	NaLu[B(SO_{4})_{2}]_{4}		tetragonal	I4̅	a=11.7060 c=8.0610 Z=2	1104.60	3.036		
	KLu[B(SO_{4})_{2}]_{4}		tetragonal	I4̅	a=11.7369 c=8.0476 Z=2	1108.60	3.073		
	RbLu[B(SO_{4})_{2}]_{4}		tetragonal	P4̅	a=11.779 c=8.034 Z=2	1114.62	3.195		
	CsLu[B(SO_{4})_{2}]_{4}		tetragonal	P4̅	Z=2			contained H_{3}O^{+}	
	[Au_{3}Cl_{4}][B(S_{2}O_{7})_{2}]		monoclinic	P2_{1}/c	a=10.6266 b=12.7938 c=12.7373 β=99.322° Z=4	1708.82	4.259	yellow	
	[Au_{2}Cl_{4}][B(S_{2}O_{7})_{2}](SO_{3})		orthorhombic	Fddd	a=13.1467, b=17.8576 c=31.711 Z=16	7444.8	3.49	metallic grey or transparent green dependent on polarization	
	TlSb[B(SO4)2]4		monoclinic	C2	a=16.689 b=8.1093 c=11.859 β=134.72 Z=2	1140.5	3.31		
	Pb[B_{2}(SO_{4})_{4}]	613.05	orthorhombic	Pnna	a=12.516 b=12.521 c=7.302 Z=4	114.43	3.558	loop chain	
	Pb[B_{2}O(SO_{4})_{3}]		orthorhombic	P2_{1}/m	a=4.4000 b=12.1019 c=8.6043				
	Bi_{2}[B_{2}(SO_{4})_{6}]	659.08	orthorhombic	C2/c	a = 13.568, b = 11.490, c = 11.106 Z=4	1728.8	3.894		
	(H_{3}O)Bi[B(SO_{4})_{2}]_{4}	1039.72	tetragonal	I4̅	a=11.857, c=8.149 Z=2	1156.84	2.99	colourless; non-linear optical	
	(NH_{4})Bi[B(SO_{4})_{2}]_{4}		tetragonal	I4̅	Z=2 a=11.8746 c=8.1360	1147.2	3.007		
	(NO)Bi[B(SO_{4})_{2}]_{4}		tetragonal	I4̅	a=11.8277 c=8.1315 Z=2	1137.5	3.068		
	(NO_{2})Bi[B(SO_{4})_{2}]_{4}		tetragonal	I4̅	a=11.9081 c=8.1160 Z=2	1150.87	3.078		
	LiBi[B(SO_{4})_{2}]_{4}		tetragonal	I4̅	a=11.8189 c=8.1235 Z=2	1134.74	3.008		
	NaBi[B(SO_{4})_{2}]_{4}		tetragonal	I4̅	a=11.8863 c=8.1176 Z=2	1146.89	3.022		
	KBi[B(SO_{4})_{2}]_{4}		tetragonal	I4̅	a=11.835 c=8.1421 Z=2	1140.44	3.086		
	RbBi[B(SO_{4})_{2}]_{4}		tetragonal	P4̅	a=11.883 c=8.1315 Z=2	1148.18	3.200		
	CsBi[B(SO_{4})_{2}]_{4}		tetragonal	P4̅	a=11.964 c=8.120 Z=2	1162.18	3.297		
	(UO_{2})[B(SO_{4})_{2}(SO_{3}OH)]	569.52	triclinic	P1̅	a=5.448 b=7.021 c=13.522 α =92.248° β =95.347° γ =101.987° Z=2		3.762	green	
	(UO_{2})_{2}[B_{2}O(SO_{4})_{3}(SO_{3}OH)_{2}]	1058.23	monoclinic	P2_{1}/n	a=10.872 b=11.383 c=14.812 β=92.481 Z=4		3.838	yellow	
