= Borate bromide =

Mixed anion compounds

The borate bromides are mixed anion compounds that contain borate and bromide anions. They are in the borate halide family of compounds which also includes borate fluorides, borate chlorides, and borate iodides.

== List ==
name	chem	mw	crystal system	space group	unit cell Å	volume	density	comment	references
	Li_{3}B_{8}O_{13}Br	395.21	orthorhombic	Pca2_{1}	a 17.3967(5)Å b 9.4077(3)Å c 6.6750	1092.45	2.403	birefringence 0.088@1064 nm	
	Na_{3}B_{4}O_{7}Br		hexagonal	P6_{5}22	a = 8.146 c = 20.24	1163.1	2.605		
	Na_{11}B_{21}O_{36}Br_{2}	1215.72	monoclinic	C2/c	a=15.722 b=8.951 c=24.087 β=100.728 Z=4	3330.3	2.425		
KBOB	K_{3}B_{6}O_{10}Br	422.07	trigonal	R3m	a=10.1153 c=8.8592 Z=3	785.02	2.678	colourless	
	K_{9}[B_{4}O_{5}(OH)_{4}]_{3}(CO_{3})Br·7H_{2}O	1191.75	hexagonal	P6_2c	a=11243 c=17.132 Z=2	1875	2.11	band gap 5.65 eV	
	Zn_{2}BO_{3}Br·H_{2}O	287.48	orthorhombic	P2_{1}2_{1}2_{1}	a=4.962 b=8.484 c=14.644 Z=4	616.5	3.097	NLO 0.6x KDP	
	KZn_{2}BO_{3}Br_{2}	345.92	trigonal	R32	a=4.9611 c=27.221 Z=3	580.2	2.970	white	
	RbZn_{2}BO_{3}Br_{2}	388.47	trigonal	R32	a=4.9618 c=28.199 Z=3	601.2	3.219	white	
	Ag_{4}B_{4}O_{7}Br_{2}	746.52	hexagonal	P6_{1}22	a=8.8291 c=44.7416 Z=12	3020.5	4.92		
	Ag_{4}BrB_{7}O_{12}	779	triclinic	P1̅	a=8.802 b=8.864 c=9.287 α=64.618 β=74.695 γ=60.765° Z=2	569.9		pale yellow; layered	
	Sn_{2}B_{5}O_{9}Br	515.34	orthorhombic	Pnn2	a = 11.398 b = 11.446 c = 6.553 Z=4	854.9	4.004	birefringence=0.439 at 546 nm; SHG 4.8x; white	
	Sn_{3}B_{3}O_{7}Br	580.41	orthorhombic	Pbca	a=10.677 b=8.471 c=20.174 Z=8	1825	4.226	birefringence 0.123@1064 nm	
	NaBa_{4}(GaB_{4}O_{9})_{2}Br_{3}	1326.00	tetragonal	P4_{2}nm	a=12.33 c=6.91 Z=2	1053	4.18	NLO 1.1x KDP	
	La[B_{5}O_{8}(OH)(H_{2}O)_{2}Br]	448.87	monoclinic	P2_{1}/n	a=6.520 b=15.213 c=10.704 β=90.017 Z=4	1061.6	2.808	colourless	
LaBOBr	La[B_{7}O_{10}(OH)_{3}(H_{2}O)Br]	518.49	monoclinic	P2_{1}/n	a=7.944 b=15.105 c=9.836 β=90 Z=4	1180.3	2.918		
	Ce[B_{5}O_{8}(OH)(H_{2}O)_{2}Br]	450.08	monoclinic	P2_{1}/n	a=6.495 b=15.159 c=10.670 β=90.048 Z=4	1050.6	2.846	colourless	
CeBOBr	Ce[B_{6}O_{9}(OH)_{2}(H_{2}O)_{2}Br]·0.5H_{2}O	500.89	monoclinic	P2_{1}/n	a=8.1507 b=14.874 c=9.867 β=90.085 Z=4	1196.3	2.781		
PrBOBr	Pr[B_{6}O_{9}(OH)_{2}(H_{2}O)_{2}Br]·0.5H_{2}O	501.68	monoclinic	P2_{1}/n	a=8.1346 b=14.819 c=9.847 β=90.153 Z=4	1187.0	2.807	green	
	Pr[B_{5}O_{8}(OH)(H_{2}O)_{2}Br]	450.87	monoclinic	P2_{1}/n	a=6.4910 b=15.143 c=10.664 β=90.0440 Z=4	1048.2	2.857		
NdBOBr	Nd_{2}[B_{12}O_{17.5}(OH)_{5}(H_{2}O)_{4}Br_{1.5}]Br_{0.5}·H_{2}O	1018.02	orthorhombic	Fdd2	a=30.6641 b=19.7946 c=16.0737 Z=16	9757.3	2.772	purple	
	Nd_{4}[B_{18}O_{25}(OH)_{13}Br_{3}]	1619.27	monoclinic	P2/c	a=10.544 b=6.451 c=23.485 β=97.754 Z=2	1583	3.397	purple	
SmBOBr	Sm_{4}[B_{18}O_{25}(OH)_{13}Br_{3}]	1643.71	monoclinic	P2_{1}/n	a=10.508 b=6.427 c=23.408 β=97.585 Z=2	1567	3.484		
	Ba_{2}BO_{3}Br			P3̅m1	a = 5.516, c = 11.019, and Z = 2				
	Ba_{3}BO_{3}Br_{3}		triclinic	P1̅	a = 9.280, b = 9.349 c = 13.025, α = 92.71°, β = 98.29°, γ = 116.20° and Z = 4				
	Ba_{7}(BO_{3})_{3}SiO_{4}Br		orthorhombic	P6_{3}mc					
	Ba_{7}(BO_{3})_{3}GeO_{4}Br	1354.31	orthorhombic	Pbam	a=20.381 b=7.477 c=11.175 Z=4	1702.9	5.283		
	Pb_{2}Ba_{3}(BO_{3})_{3}Br	1082.74	orthorhombic	C222_{1}	a=10.538 b=14.2878 c=8.107 Z=4	1220.7	5.891	NLO 3.1×KDP; colourless	
