= Borotellurites =

Borotellurites are chemical mixed anion compounds that contain any kind of borate and tellurite ions bound together via oxygen. They are distinct from borotellurates in which tellurium is in the +6 oxidation state. There are also analogous boroselenites, with selenium instead of tellurium also in the +4 oxidation state. Borotellurites are colourless and many are birefringent.

== List ==
chem	mw	crystal system	space group	unit cell	volume	density	comments	references
YTeBO_{5}	307.32	orthorhombic	Pbca	a=10.458 b=6.5842 c=11.092 Z=8	763.75	5.345	birefringence 0.08@546 nm	
K_{3}BaTeB_{7}O_{15}		monoclinic	P2_{1}/c	a=8.979 b=6.303 c=25.869 β=98.095°			transparent above 235 nm; birefringence 0.03@1064 nm	
Rb_{3}BaTeB_{7}O_{15}		monoclinic	P2_{1}/n	a=9.102 b=6.409 c=25.794 β=97.278°				
LaTeBO_{5}	357.32	orthorhombic	Pbca	a=10.8220 b=6.9216 c=11.5812 Z=8	867.50	5.472	colourless; large birefringence	
β-LaTeBO_{5}	357.32	monoclinic	P2_{1}/c	a=16.7501 b=7.1820 c=8.3492 β=104.124° Z=4	974.04	4.873	birefringence 0.134@546 nm	
GdTeBO_{5}	375.66	orthorhombic	Pbca	a=10.5878 b=6.6574 c=11.2141 Z=8	790.45	6.313	birefringence 0.074@546 nm	
TbTeBO_{5}	373.33	orthorhombic	Pbca	a=10.5343 b=6.6235 c=11.153 Z=8	778.17	6.441		
PbTeB_{4}O_{9}		triclinic	P-1	a=6.5740 b=6.7445 c=9.8903 α=70.105° β=78.877° γ=61.726°			birefringence 0.099@1064 nm	
