= Borate iodide =

Mixed anion compounds

The borate iodides are mixed anion compounds that contain both borate and iodide anions. They are in the borate halide family of compounds which also includes borate fluorides, borate chlorides, and borate bromides.

== List ==
name	chem	mw	crystal system	space group	unit cell Å	volume	density	comment	references
	Cr_{3}B_{7}O_{13}I			F4̅c	a = 12.171 Z=8	18029	4.17		
	Mn_{3}B_{7}O_{13}I			F4̅3c	a = 12.32 Z=8	1870	4.09		
	Fe_{3}B_{7}O_{13}I			Pca2_{1}	a = 8.654, c = 12.2336 Z=4	915.57	4.19		
	Co_{3}B_{7}O_{13}I			F4̅3c	a = 12.119 Z=8	1779.9	4.38		
	Ni_{3}B_{7}O_{13}I			Pca2_{1}	a = 08.511 c = 12.037 Z=4	871.9	4.47	magnetoelectric, ferroelectric and ferroelastic	
	Cu_{3}B_{7}O_{13}I			F4̅3c	a = 12.0203 Z=8	1736.8	4.60		
	Ag_{4}B_{4}O_{7}I_{2}	840.52	hexagonal	P6_{1}22	a=8.9576 c=45.1956 Z=12	3140.6	5.33		
tin iodide borate	Sn_{3}[B_{3}O_{7}]I		orthorhombic	Pbca	a = 10.718, b = 8.523, and c = 20.168 Z = 8				
	La[B_{5}O_{8}(OH)(H_{2}O)_{2}I]	495.86	monoclinic	P2_{1}/n	a=6.529 b=15.494 c=10.744 β=90.353 Z=4	1086.8	3.03	colourless	
	La[B_{7}O_{11}(OH)(H_{2}O)_{3}I]	581.48	orthorhombic	P2_{1}/n	a=8.178 b=17.251 c=9.849 Z=4	1389.4	2.78	colourless	
	Ce[B_{5}O_{8}(OH)(H_{2}O)_{2}I]	497.07	monoclinic	P2_{1}/n	a= 6.498 b=15.416 c=10.704 β=90.306 Z=4	1072.3	3.079	colourless	
	Ce[B_{7}O_{11}(OH)(H_{2}O)_{3}I]	582.69	orthorhombic	P2_{1}/n	a=8.1641 b=17.205 c=9.816 Z=4	1378.8	2.807	colourless	
	Pr[B_{5}O_{8}(OH)(H_{2}O)_{2}I]	497.86	monoclinic	P2_{1}/n	a= 6.488 b=15.392 c=10.686 β=90.254 Z=4	1067.0	3.099	green	
	Pr[B_{7}O_{11}(OH)(H_{2}O)_{3}I]	583.48	orthorhombic	P2_{1}/n	a=8.1504 b=17.205 c=9.814 Z=4	1376.2	2.816	light green	
	Nd[B_{5}O_{8}(OH)(H_{2}O)_{2}I]	501.19	monoclinic	P2_{1}/n	a=6.4763 b=15.350 c=10.6734 β=90.316 Z=4	1061.0	3.137	purple	
	Nd[B_{7}O_{11}(OH)(H_{2}O)_{3}I]	586.81	orthorhombic	P2_{1}/n	a=8.1464 b=17.199 c=9.735 Z=4	1372.2	2.841	purple	
	Sm[B_{7}O_{11}(OH)(H_{2}O)_{3}I]	592.92	orthorhombic	P2_{1}/n	a=8.102 b=17.158 c=9.733 Z=4	1352.9	2.911	colourless	
dilead borate iodide	Pb_{2}BO_{3}I		trigonal	P321				NLO 10 × KDP	
	Pb_{2}B_{5}O_{9}I	739.35	orthorhombic	Pnm2	a=11.561 b=11.700 c=6.524 Z=4	882.5	5.565	colourless or yellow	
	Pb_{6}O_{4}(BO_{3})I	1492.85	orthorhombic	Pmmn	a= 5.78 b=9.72 c=10.63 Z=2	597	8.302	colourless	
	Pb_{10}O_{4}(BO_{3})_{3}I_{3}	2693.03	monoclinic	Cc	a=16.6423 b=9.0277 c=16.9746 β=115.658 Z=4	2298.8	7.781	colourless	
tetrabismuth borate tetraoxy iodide	Bi_{4}BO_{7}I	1085.6	orthorhombic	Immm	a=3.959 b=13.453 c=3.969 Z=1	211.4	8.5279	dark orange	
	Pu[B_{7}O_{11}(OH)(H_{2}O)_{2}I]	668.57	monoclinic	P2_{1}/n	a=8.110 b=17.060 c=9.792 β=90.133 Z=4	1354.9	3.278	pale blue	
