= Borotellurate =

The borotellurates are heteropoly anion compounds which have tellurate groups attached to boron atoms. The ratio of tellurate to borate reflects the degree of condensation. In [TeO_{4}(BO_{3})_{2}]^{8-} the anions are linked into a chain. In [TeO_{2}(BO_{3})_{4}]^{10−} the structure is zero dimensional with isolated anions. These arrangements of oxygen around boron and tellurium can have forms resembling silicates. The first borotellurates to be discovered were the mixed sodium rare earth compounds in 2015.

The tellurate is of the form TeO_{6} in an octahedral arrangement. The borate is in the form BO_{3}, with two oxygen atoms shared with two tellurate TeO_{6} groups.

Related compounds include boroantimonates, galloborates, borogermanates, borophosphates, boroselenates, boroselenites, and borosulfates.

== Formation ==
Borotellurates are formed by heating boric acid, and tellurium dioxide, with metal carbonates or oxides at over 800 °C. Lower temperatures can be used with a flux like potassium carbonate.

== Reactions ==
When heated to around 800 °C the borotellurates decompose by emitting TeO_{3} vapour and form a metal borate or metal tellurite.

== List ==
	chem	mw	crystal system	space group	unit cell Å	volume	density	comment	references
	Rb_{3}BaTeB_{7}O_{15}	837.02	monoclinic	P2_{1}/n	a=9.102 b=6.409 c=25.794 β=97.278 Z=4	1492.6	3.725	actually this is a tellurite	
	Sr_{5}TeO_{2}(BO_{3})_{4}	832.94	tetragonal	P4/mnc	a= 7.6005 c=10.401 Z=2	600.82	4.604	colourless; birefringence is 0.048 at 1064 nm	
	Na_{2}Y_{2}TeO_{4}(BO_{3})_{2}	533.02	monoclinic	P2_{1}/c	a=6.3073, b=9.9279, c=6.7219; β=104.26°; Z=2	407.94	4.339		
barium tellurium borate	Ba_{4}B_{8}TeO_{19}	1067.44	monoclinic	Cc	a=11.512 b=6.667 c=19.700 β=105.734 Z=4	1455.3	4.872	double layers; SHG 1×KH_{2}PO_{4}	
	Ba_{2}Mg_{2}TeB_{2}O_{10}	632.52	orthorhombic	Cmca	a=6.177 b=10.383 c=12.956 Z=4	830.9	5		
	Na_{2}Dy_{2}TeO_{4}(BO_{3})_{2}	680.20	monoclinic	P2_{1}/c	a=6.3089, b=9.9808, c=6.7489; β=104.394°; Z=2	411.62	5.488	decompose 842.1	
	Na_{2}Ho_{2}TeO_{4}(BO_{3})_{2}	685.06	monoclinic	P2_{1}/c	a=6.3060, b=9.9360, c=6.7339; β=104.230°; Z=2	408.98	5.563	decompose 844.2	
	Na_{2}Er_{2}TeO_{4}(BO_{3})_{2}	689.72	monoclinic	P2_{1}/c	a=6.2964, b=9.9056, c=6.7089; β=104.110°; Z=2	405.81	5.645	decompose 850.5	
	Na_{2}Tm_{2}TeO_{4}(BO_{3})_{2}	693.06	monoclinic	P2_{1}/c	a=6.2801, b=9.8594, c=6.6918; β=104.010°; Z=2	401.89	5.727	decompose 852.0	
	Na_{2}Yb_{2}TeO_{4}(BO_{3})_{2}	701.28	monoclinic	P2_{1}/c	a=6.2631, b=9.8269, c=6.6741; β=103.972°; Z=2	398.62	5.843	decompose 871.0	
	Na_{2}Lu_{2}TeO_{4}(BO_{3})_{2}	705.14	monoclinic	P2_{1}/c	a=6.2588, b=9.7998, c=6.6539; β=103.714°; Z=2	396.48	5.907	decompose 878.5	
	Pb_{2}Mg_{2}TeB_{2}O_{10}	772.22	orthorhombic	Cmca	a=6.055 b=10.300 c=12.521 Z=4	780.9	7		
