= Boroselenate =

The boroselenates are chemical compounds containing interlinked borate and selenate groups sharing oxygen atoms. Both selenate and borate groups are tetrahedral in shape. They have similar structures to borosulfates and borophosphates. The borotellurates' tellurium atom is much bigger, so TeO_{6} octahedra appear instead.

== List ==
	chem	mw	crystal system	space group	unit cell Å	volume	density	comment	references
boroseleniteselenate	B_{2}Se_{3}O_{10}		monoclinic	P2_{1}/c	a = 4.3466, b = 7.0237, c = 22.1460, β = 94.922°, Z = 4				
hydronium hexasodium boroselenate selenate	(H_{3}O)Na_{6}[B(SeO_{4})_{4}](SeO_{4})		tetragonal	I4̅	a=9.9796, c=18.2614			Zunyite structure	
tetrapotassium hydrogen boroselenate	K_{4}[BSe_{4}O_{15}(OH)]		triclinic	P1̅	a=7.5303, b=7.5380, c=42.3659, α=88.740, β=89.971, γ=89.971° Z=6			Zunyite structure	
	Rb_{3}[B(SeO_{4})_{3}]		orthorhombic	Ibca	a=7.508, b=15.249, c=23.454, Z=8			linear	
	Cs_{3}[B(SeO_{4})_{3}]		monoclinic	P2_{1}/c	a=11.3552, b=7.9893, c=15.7692, β=101.013° Z=4			linear	
