= Borate phosphate =

Identifiers
3D model (JSmol)	1:1: Interactive image
ChemSpider	1:1: 24769519
- InChI: 1:1: InChI=1S/BO3.H3O4P/c2-1(3)4;1-5(2,3)4/h;(H3,1,2,3,4)/q-3;/p-3 Key: IVHMVLWSSMPWPQ-UHFFFAOYSA-K
- SMILES: 1:1: B([O-])([O-])[O-].[O-]P(=O)([O-])[O-]

Properties
Chemical formula	BO_{7}P^{−6}
Molar mass	153.78 g·mol^{−1}
- Except where otherwise noted, data are given for materials in their standard state (at 25 °C [77 °F], 100 kPa). Infobox references

Borate phosphates are mixed anion compounds containing separate borate and phosphate anions. They are distinct from the borophosphates where the borate is linked to a phosphate via a common oxygen atom. The borate phosphates have a higher ratio of cations to number of borates and phosphates, as compared to the borophosphates.

There are also organic esters of both borate and phosphate, e.g. NADH-borate.

== Production ==
In the high temperature method, ingredients are heated together at atmospheric pressure. Products are anhydrous, and production or borophosphates is likely.

The boron flux method involves dissolving ingredients such as an ammonium phosphate and metal carbonate in an excess of molten boric acid.

== Use ==
Borate phosphates are of research interest for their optical, electrooptical or magnetic properties.

== List ==
	chem	mw	crystal system	space group	unit cell Å	volume	density	comment	references
	Be_{3}(BO_{3})(PO_{4})		hexagonal					SHG	
	α-Mg_{3}[BPO_{7}]		orthorhombic	Immm	a=8·495, b=4·886, c=12·565 Z=4				
	Mg_{3}[BPO_{7}]		monoclinic	Cm					
	Mg_{3}[BPO_{7}]		hexagonal	P6_2m					
Lüneburgite	Mg_{3}[B_{2}(OH)_{6}](PO_{4})_{2} · 6H_{2}O		triclinic				2.05	Biaxial (-) n_{α} = 1.520 – 1.522 n_{β} = 1.540 – 1.541 n_{γ} = 1.545 – 1.548 2V 52° to 60° Max birefringence δ = 0.025 – 0.026	
	Ca_{3}[BPO_{7}]		monoclinic		a=8.602 b=4.891 c=12.806 β=102.30				
Seamanite	Mn^{2+}_{3}[B(OH)_{4}](PO_{4})(OH)_{2}		orthorhombic	Pbnm	a = 7.81 Å, b = 15.11 Å, c = 6.69 Å Z=4	789.48	3.08	Biaxial (+) n_{α} = 1.640 n_{β} = 1.663 n_{γ} = 1.665 2V 40° Max birefringence δ = 0.025	
Laptevite-(Ce)	Ca_{6}(Fe^{2+},Mn^{2+})Y_{3}REE_{7}(SiO_{4})_{3}(PO_{4})(B_{3}Si_{3}O_{18})(BO_{3})F_{11}		trigonal	R3m	a = 10.804, c = 27.726 Z=3	2802.6	4.61	Uniaxial (-) n_{ω} = 1.741 n_{ε} = 1.720 Max birefringence δ = 0.021	
	(CoPO_{4})_{4}, B_{5}O_{6}(OH)_{4}N(CH_{3})_{4}(CH_{3}NH_{3})	1036.10	orthorhombic	I222	a=6.7601 b=7.5422 c=34.822 Z=2	1775.4	1.938	red	
	Co_{3}[BPO_{7}]		monoclinic	Cm	a=9.774, b=12.688, c=4.9057, β=119.749°; Z=4	528.2		purple	
	α-Zn_{3}[BPO_{7}]	349.89	orthorhombic		a=8.438 b=4.884 c=12.558				
	α-Zn_{3}[BPO_{7}]	349.89	monoclinic	Cm	a=9.725 b=12.720 c=4.874 β=119.80 Z=4				
	β-Zn_{3}[BPO_{7}]	349.89	hexagonal	P-6	a=8.4624 c=13.0690 Z=6	810.51	4.301	colourless	
	α-Sr_{3}[BPO_{7}]		orthorhombic		a=9.0561, b=9.7984, c=13.9531				
	Sr_{10}[(PO_{4})_{5.5}(BO_{4})_{0.5}](BO_{2})			P3_	a=9.7973, c=7.3056, Z=1	607.29			
	SrCo_{2}(BO_{3})(PO_{4})	359.26	monoclinic	P2_{1}/c	a=6.485 b=9.270 c=10.066 β=111.14 Z=4	548.7	4.349	red	
Byzantievite	Ba_{5}(Ca,REE,Y)_{22}(Ti,Nb)_{18}(SiO_{4})_{4}[(PO_{4}, SiO_{4})]_{4}(BO_{3})_{9}O_{22}[(OH),F]_{43}(H_{2}O)_{1.5}		trigonal	R3	a = 9.1202, c = 102.145	7,357.9	4.10	Uniaxial (-) n_{ω} = 1.940 n_{ε} = 1.860 Max birefringence δ = 0.080 16 different layers in structure	
Rhabdoborite	Mg_{12}(V^{5+},Mo^{6+},W^{6+})_{1} · _{5}O_{6}{[BO_{3}]^{6-}x[(P,As)O_{4}]xF^{2-}x} (x < _{1})		hexagonal	P6_{3}	a = 10.6314, c = 4.5661	446.95			
	CsNa_{2}Y_{2}(BO_{3})(PO_{4})_{2}	605.46	orthorhombic	Cmcm	a=6.9491 b=14.907 c=10.6201 Z=4	1100.2	3.655	colourless	
	CsZn_{4}(BO_{3})(PO_{4})_{2}	679.30	orthorhombic	Pbca	a=14.49 b=10.02 c=16.45 Z=8	2388	3.779	colourless	
	Ba_{3}(BO_{3})(PO_{4})		hexagonal	P6_{3}mc	a=5.4898, c=14.7551, Z=2				
	Ba_{3}(BO_{3})(PO_{4})		monoclinic	P2/m	a = 11.7947, b = 9.6135, c = 12.9548, β= 111.25°	1369.08			
	Ba_{11}B_{26}O_{44}(PO_{4})_{2}(OH)_{6}		monoclinic	P2_{1}/c	a=6.891, b=13.629, c=25.851, β=90.04°				
	Ba_{3}(ZnB_{5}O_{10})PO_{4}	786.41	orthorhombic	Pnm2_{1}	a = 10.399 b = 7.064 c = 8.204 Z=2	602.6	4.334		
	La_{7}O_{6}(BO_{3})(PO_{4})_{2}		monoclinic		a=7.019 b=17.915 c=12.653 β=97.52	1577.27			
	Pr_{7}O_{6}(BO_{3})(PO_{4})_{2}		monoclinic	P12_{1}/n1	a=6.8939 b=17.662 c=12.442 β=97.24 Z=4	1502.9		green	
	Nd_{7}O_{6}(BO_{3})(PO_{4})_{2}		monoclinic		a=6.862 b=17.591 c=12.375 β=97.18	1482.12			
	Sm_{7}O_{6}(BO_{3})(PO_{4})_{2}		monoclinic	P12_{1}/n1	a=6.778 b=17.396 c=12.218 β=96.96 Z=4	1430.0		yellow	
	CsNa_{2}Sm_{2}(BO_{3})(PO_{4})_{2}	728.34	orthorhombic	Cmcm	a=7.0631 b=15.288 c=10.725 Z=4	1158.1	4.177	colourless	
	CsNa_{2}Ho_{2}(BO_{3})(PO_{4})_{2}								
	CsNa_{2}Er_{2}(BO_{3})(PO_{4})_{2}								
	CsNa_{2}Tm_{2}(BO_{3})(PO_{4})_{2}								
	Gd_{7}O_{6}(BO_{3})(PO_{4})_{2}		monoclinic		a=6.704 b=17.299 c=12.100 β=96.94	1393.11			
	Dy_{7}O_{6}(BO_{3})(PO_{4})_{2}		monoclinic		a=6.623 b=17.172 c=11.960 β=96.76	1350.84			
	K_{3}Yb[OB(OH)_{2}]_{2}[HOPO_{3}]_{2}			R3_	a=5.6809, c=36.594 Z=3	1022.8			
	CsNa_{2}Yb_{2}(BO_{3})(PO_{4})_{2}								
	K_{3}Lu[OB(OH)_{2}]_{2}[HOPO_{3}]_{2}			R3_	a=5.6668, c=36.692 Z=3	1020.4			
	CsNa_{2}Lu_{2}(BO_{3})(PO_{4})_{2}	777.58	orthorhombic	Cmcm	a = 6.8750 b = 14.6919 c = 10.5581	1066.44	4.843		
	Pb_{4}O(BO_{3})(PO_{4})	998.54	monoclinic	P2_{1}/c	a=10.202 b=7.005 c=12.92 β=113.057 Z=4	849.6	7.807	colourless	
	LiPb_{4}(BO_{3})(PO_{4})_{2}	1084.85	orthorhombic	Pbca	a=12.613 b=6.551 c=25.63 Z=8	2095	6.875	colourless	
	Bi_{4}O_{3}(BO_{3})(PO_{4})	1037.70	orthorhombic	Pbca	a=5.536 b=14.10 c=22.62 Z=8	1766	7.807	colourless	
	Th_{2}[BO_{4}][PO_{4}]		monoclinic	P2_{1}/c	a=8.4665, b=7.9552, c=8.2297, β= 103.746° Z = 4				
	Ba_{5}[(UO_{2})(PO_{4})_{3}(B_{5}O_{9})]·nH_{2}O							interlocking nanotubes; absorbs water from air	
	U_{2}[BO_{4}][PO_{4}]	645.84	monoclinic	P2_{1}/c	a = 8.546, b = 7.753, c = 8.163 β = 102.52° Z=4	528.0	8.12	generated at 12.5 GPa + 1000 °C; emerald green	
	[Sr_{8}(PO_{4})_{2}][(UO_{2})(PO_{4})_{2}(B_{5}O_{9})_{2}]	1746.97	monoclinic	P2_{1}/n	a = 6.5014, b =22.4302, c =9.7964 β = 90.241° Z=2	1428.57	4.061	orange	
