= Borate fluoride =

Class of chemical compounds

The borate fluorides or fluoroborates are compounds containing borate or complex borate ions along with fluoride ions that form salts with cations such as metals. They are in the broader category of mixed anion compounds. They are not to be confused with tetrafluoroborates (BF_{4}) or the fluorooxoborates which have fluorine bonded to boron.

== Examples ==
formula	name	mw	system	space group	unit cell Å	volume Å^{3}	density	comment	references
Be_{2}(BO_{3})(OH,F) · H_{2}O	Berborite		trigonal	P3	a = 4.434, c = 5.334	90.82		colourless Uniaxial (-) n_{ω} = 1.580 n_{ε} = 1.485 Max birefringence δ = 0.095	
γ-Be_{2}BO_{3}F	γ-BBF	95.83	trigonal	R32	a=4.4418 c=19.909 Z=3	340.17	1.946	Uniaxial (-) SHG 2.3 × KDP	
NH_{4}Be_{2}BO_{3}F_{2}	ABBF	132.87	trigonal	R32	a=4.4398 c=12.4697 Z=3	212.87	2.243	Uniaxial (-) n_{o}=1.49389 n_{e}=1.41919 at 636 nm	
NaBe_{2}BO_{3}F_{2}	sodium beryllium borate fluoride (NBBF)			C2	a=12.643 b=8.729 c=7.591 β=113.6°	768		double layers of borate rings sandwiching barium atoms. Between pairs of double layers are sodium ions with fluoride.	
Mg_{2}(BO_{3})(F,OH)	Pertsevite-(F)		orthorhombic	Pna2_{1}	a = 20.49, b = 4.571, c = 11.89 Z=16	1,113.6		Density 3.12 transparent Biaxial (+) n_{α} = 1.609 n_{β} = 1.620 n_{γ} = 1.642 2V: 65° Max birefringence: δ = 0.033	
Mg_{3}(BO_{3})(F,OH)_{3}	Fluoborite		hexagonal		a = 8.8, c = 3.1	208		colourless Uniaxial (-) n_{ω} = 1.570 n_{ε} = 1.534 Max birefringence δ = 0.036	
Mg_{3}(OH)[B(OH)_{4}]_{2}(SO_{4})F	sulfoborite		orthorhombic	Pnma	a=10.132 b=12.537 c=7.775	987.6		Biaxial (-) n_{α} = 1.527 n_{β} = 1.536 n_{γ} = 1.551 2V 79° Max birefringence δ = 0.024	
Na_{6}Mg_{3}B_{10}O_{18}F_{6}			monoclinic	P2_{1}/c	a=13.420 b=6.400 c=10.701 β=90.693°			band gap 5.40 eV; birefringence Δn = 0.039 at 1064 nm	
NaMgBe_{2}(BO_{3})_{2}F	NMBBF			P3̅c1	a=4.5408 c=13.439			birefringence 0.081 at 546.1 nm	
Al_{6}(BO_{3})_{5}F_{3}	Jeremejevite		hexagonal	P6_{3}/m	a = 8.5591, c = 8.1814	519		density 3.28 Uniaxial (-) n_{ω} = 1.653 n_{ε} = 1.640 Max birefringence δ = 0.013	
Al_{8}(BO_{3})_{4}(B_{2}O_{5})F_{8}		704.7	tetragonal	P4_{2}/mmc	a=9.134 c=19.112 Z=4	1,595		density 2.935 colourless	
Na(Mg_{3})Al_{6}(Si_{6}O_{18})(BO_{3})_{3}(OH)_{3}F	Fluor-dravite		trigonal	R3m	a = 15.955, c = 7.153 Z=3	1,577		density 3.120 dark brown Uniaxial (-) n_{ω} = 1.645(2) n_{ε} = 1.621(2) Max birefringence δ = 0.024	
Na(Li_{1.5}Al_{1.5})Al_{6}(Si_{6}O_{18})(BO_{3})_{3}(OH)_{3}F	Fluor-elbaite		trigonal	R3m	a = 15.8933, c = 7.1222	1,558		blue green Uniaxial (-)	
K_{6}B_{12}O_{19}F_{4}		744.32	orthorhombic	Pnma	a =15.291 b =7.707 c =8.672 Z=2	1022.0	2.419		
KBe_{2}BO_{3}F_{2}	KBBF		hexagonal	R32	a=4.427 c=18.744	318.3	2.40	Be_{2}BO_{6}F_{2} rings SHG 1.2 × KDP; UV cutoff 147 nm	
Ca_{5}(BO_{3})_{3}F									
Li_{3}CaB_{2}O_{5}F		363.04	orthorhombic	Pnma	a=25.685 b=3.4697 c=5.4404 Z=2	484.84	2.487	colourless	
Li_{5}Ca_{9}(BO_{3})_{7}F_{2}				P1					
NaCaBe_{2}B_{2}O_{6}F									
KCaBe_{2}B_{2}O_{6}F		467.64		P3_1c	a=4.705 c=14.554 Z=2	279.1	2.783		
Ca(Li_{2}Al)Al_{6}(Si_{6}O_{18})(BO_{3})_{3}(OH)_{3}F	Fluor-liddicoatite		trigonal	R3m	a = 15.875, c = 7.126 Z=3	1,555		density 3.02 Uniaxial (-) n_{ω} = 1.637 n_{ε} = 1.621 Max birefringence δ = 0.016	
CaMg_{3}(Al_{5}Mg)(Si_{6}O_{18})(BO_{3})_{3}(OH)_{3}F	Fluor-uvite		trigonal	R3m	a = 15.954, c = 7.214 Z=3	1,590		black Uniaxial n_{ω} = 1.637 - 1.668 n_{ε} = 1.619 - 1.639 Max birefringence δ = 0.018 - 0.029	
KCaBe_{2}B_{2}O_{6}F									
Sc_{2}F_{2}(B_{2}O_{5})		229.54	orthorhombic	Pbam	a=9.667 b=14.199 c=4.0395 Z=4	554.4	2.750	colourless	
K_{11}Sc_{5}(B_{5}O_{10})_{4}F_{6}			orthorhombic	Fdd2	a 56.769 b 12.207 c 12.6088			transparent to <190 nm	
Na(Mn^{2+})_{3}Al_{6}(Si_{6}O_{18})(BO_{3})_{3}(OH)_{3}F	Fluor-tsilaisite		trigonal	R3m	a = 15.9398, c = 7.1363	1,570		greenish yellow Uniaxial (-)	
NaFe_{3}Al_{6}Si_{6}B_{3}O_{30}F									
Na(Fe^{2+}_{3})Al_{6}(Si_{6}O_{18})(BO_{3})_{3}(OH)_{3}F	Fluor-schorl		trigonal	R3m	a = 16.005, c = 7.176 Z=3	1,591.9		black Uniaxial (-) n_{ω} = 1.660 - 1.661 n_{ε} = 1.636 - 1.637 Max birefringence δ = 0.024	
Na(Fe^{3+}_{3})Al_{6}(Si_{6}O_{18})(BO_{3})_{3}O_{3}F	Fluor-buergerite		trigonal	R3m	a = 15.8692, c = 7.1882	1,568		density 3.311 brown Uniaxial (-) n_{ω} = 1.735 n_{ε} = 1.655 Birefringence 0.080	
Ca(Fe^{2+})_{3}MgAl_{5}(Si_{6}O_{18})(BO_{3})_{3}(OH)_{3}F	Fluor-feruvite								
KCaZn_{2}(BO_{3})_{2}F									
Li_{6}RbB_{2}O_{6}F		263.73	orthorhombic	Pnma	a=8.41 b=15.96 c=5.08 Z=2	682	2.568		
RbBe_{2}BO_{3}F_{2}	RBBF		Trigonal	R32	a=4.434 c=19.758 z=3			also contains BeO_{3}F tetrahedra and BO_{3}. It transmits radiation from 180 to 3500 nm.	
Rb_{18}Mg_{6}(B_{5}O_{10})_{3}(B_{7}O_{14})_{2}F			monoclinic	C2/c	a=11.06 b=19.70 c=31.01 β=90.13°				
RbCaBe_{2}B_{2}O_{6}F			Trigonal	R32					
KSrBe_{2}B_{2}O_{6}F									
LiSr_{3}Be_{3}B_{3}O_{9}F_{4}									
NaSr_{3}Be_{3}B_{3}O_{9}F_{4}									
K_{3}Sr_{3}Li_{2}Al_{4}B_{6}O_{20}F								SHG 4 × KDP; 170 nm UV cutoff	
Ca(Y,REE,Ca,Na,Mn)_{15}Fe^{2+}(P,Si)Si_{6}B_{3}O_{34}F_{14}	Proshchenkoite-(Y)		trigonal	R3m	a = 10.7527, c = 27.4002	2,743.6		brownish	
(Y,REE,Ca,Na)_{15}(Al,Fe^{3+})(Ca_{x}As^{3+}_{1−x})(Si,As^{5+})Si_{6}B_{3}(O,F)_{48}	Hundholmenite-(Y)		trigonal	R3m	a = 10.675, c = 27.02 Z=3	2,667		density 5.206 brownish Uniaxial (-)	
(Na,Ca)_{3}(Y,Ce)_{12}Si_{6}B_{2}O_{27}F_{14}	Okanoganite-(Y)		trigonal	R3m	a = 10.7108, c = 27.040		4.35	Tan coloured Uniaxial (-) n_{ω} = 1.753 n_{ε} = 1.740 Max birefringence δ = 0.013	
? Y_{5}(SiO_{4},BO_{4})_{3}(O,OH,F)	Tritomite-(Y)		?hexagonal		a = 9.32, c = 6.84		3.05-3.4	isotropic n = 1.627 - 1.685	
Cd_{8}B_{5}O_{15}F		1212.25	cubic	Fd3̅m	a = 13.972 Z = 8	2,727	5.904	colourless	
CdZn_{2}KB_{2}O_{6}F									
Li_{3}Cs_{6}Al_{2}B_{14}O_{28}F		1490.58	orthorhombic	Pnma	a=21.8412 b=19.8875 c=7.1577 Z=4	3109.1	3.184		
CsBe_{2}BO_{3}F_{2}		247.74	trigonal	R32	a=4.4575 c=21.310 Z=3	366.7	3.366	colourless	
Cs_{18}Mg_{6}(B_{5}O_{10})_{3}(B_{7}O_{14})_{2}F			monoclinic	C2/c	a=11.234 b=20.11 c=32.12 β=90.225°				
CsCaBe_{2}B_{2}O_{6}F			trigonal	R32					
BaBOF_{3}		221.15	monoclinic	P2_{1}/c	a = 4.620 b = 15.186 c = 4.426 β = 92.045° Z=4	310.3		contains chains of -OB(F_{2})- and a double chain of BaF	
Ba_{5}(BO_{3})_{3}F									
Li_{2}BaSc(BO_{3})_{2}F		332.80	hexagonal	P6_{3}/m	a=4.895 c=14.346	297.7	3.713		
LiBa_{12}(BO_{3})_{7}F_{4}				I4/mcm					
BaBe_{2}BO_{3}F_{3}		271.16	hexagonal	P6_{3}	a=7.628 c=13.990 Z=6	704.9	3.832	UV cutoff <185 nm; birefringence 0,081 at 200 nm	
NaBa_{12}(BO_{3})_{7}F_{4}				I4/mcm					
BaMgBe_{2}(BO_{3})_{2}F_{2}	BMBBF	335.283	trigonal	P3̅c1	a=4.5898 c=15.348	280.01	3.976	colourless [Be_{2}B_{3}O_{6}F_{2}]_{∞}	
Ba_{3.75}MgB_{7}O_{14}F_{2.5}		886.50	monoclinic	C2/c	a 16.611 b 13.677 c 15.141 β 121.239° Z=8	2941.0	4.004	transparent > 203 nm; birefringence 0.081@546 nm	
BaAl(BO_{3})F_{2}			hexagonal	P6̅	a=4.8879 c=9.403 Z=2	194.5		UV cutoff 165 nm	
K_{3}Ba_{3}Li_{2}Al_{4}B_{6}O_{20}F									
K_{5}Ba_{10}(BO_{3})_{8}F			trigonal	R3̅c	a = 15.293, c = 22.699 Z = 6				
KBa_{7}Mg_{2}B_{14}O_{28}F_{5}			monoclinic	C2/c	a = 16.638 b = 13.609 c = 15.214 β = 121.309° Z=4	2943.3	3.934	colourless	
BaCaBe_{2}(BO_{3})_{2}F_{2}	BCBBF		trigonal	P3̅c1	a=4.6931 c=16.049	306.12	3.808	colourless [Be_{2}B_{3}O_{6}F_{2}]_{∞}	
Li_{2}BaSc(BO_{3})_{2}F			hexagonal	P6_{3}/m	a=4.895 c=14.346				
Ba_{3}Zn(BO_{3})(B_{2}O_{5})F		656.82	monoclinic	P2_{1}/c	a = 15.179 b = 7.0064 c = 8.763 β = 100.15° Z=4	917.4	4.755	colourless	
Ba_{4}Zn_{2}(BO_{3})_{2}(B_{2}O_{5})F_{2}		937.34	monoclinic	C2/c	a=20.39 b=4.998 c=13.068 β = 192.59 Z=44	1,331	4.679	colourless	
BaZnBe_{2}(BO_{3})_{2}F_{2}		376.35	trigonal	P3̅	a = 4.5998, c = 7.7037 Z = 1	141.16	4.427	colourless	
Rb_{3}Ba_{3}Li_{2}Al_{4}B_{6}O_{20}F									
BaCdBe_{2}(BO_{3})_{2}F_{2}	BDBBF			P3̅c1	a=4.6808 c=15.788				
Ba_{1.09}Pb_{0.91}Be_{2}(BO_{3})_{2}F_{2}	BPBBF		trigonal	P3̅m1	a = 4.7478 c = 8.386, Z = 1	163.70		UV absorption edge=279.1 nm; birefringence 0.054 at 546.1 nm; 2D [Be_{3}B_{3}O_{6}F_{3}]_{∞} layer	
LiBa_{2}Pb(BO_{3})_{2}F			orthorhombic	Pmmn	a=5.487 b=15.96 c=4.034				
KNa_{3}Na_{6}Ca_{2}Ba_{6}Mn_{6}(Ti^{4+},Nb)_{6}B_{12}Si_{36}O_{114}(O,OH,F)_{11}	Tienshanite		hexagonal	P6/m	a = 16.785, c = 10.454 Z=1	2,551		pale olive green Uniaxial (-) n_{ω} = 1.666 n_{ε} = 1.653 Max birefringence δ = 0.013	
Ca_{6}(Fe^{2+},Mn^{2+})Y_{3}REE_{7}(SiO_{4})_{3}(PO_{4})(B_{3}Si_{3}O_{18})(BO_{3})F_{11}	Laptevite-(Ce)		trigonal	R3m	a = 10.804, c = 27.726 Z=3	2,803		density 4.61 dark brown Uniaxial (-) n_{ω} = 1.741(3) n_{ε} = 1.720(3) Max birefringence δ = 0.021	
Ba(Y,Ce)_{6}Si_{3}B_{6}O_{24}F_{2}	Cappelenite-(Y)		trigonal	P3	a = 10.67, c = 4.68 Z=1	461	4.407	greenish brown	
CaMg[(Ce_{7}Y_{3})Ca_{5}](SiO_{4})_{4}(Si_{2}B_{3}AsO_{18})(BO_{3})F_{11}	Arrheniusite-(Ce)		trigonal	R3m	a = 10.8082, c = 27.5196				
Gd_{4}(BO_{2})O_{5}F			orthorhombic	Pmmn	a=15.746 b=3.8142 c=6.609 Z=2	396.9	6.45	colourless	
Gd_{2}(BO_{3})F_{3}									
Gd_{3}(BO_{3})_{2}F_{3}									
Gd_{4}[B_{4}O_{11}]F_{2}									
Ba_{2}Gd(BO_{3})_{2}F			orthorhombic	Pnma	a = 7.571 b = 10.424 c = 8.581 Z = 2				
Eu_{5}(BO_{3})_{3}F			orthorhombic	Pnma	a=7.225 b=14.124 c=9.859 Z=4	1006.1	6.306	yellow	
TlBe_{2}BO_{3}F_{2}			Trigonal	R32	a=4.4387 c=19.942 Z=3	340.27	4.673	colourless	
LiBa_{2}Pb(BO_{3})_{2}F			orthorhombic	Pmmn	a=5.487 b=15.97 c=4.034	353.4	5.887	colourless	
(Ca,Ce,La,Th)_{15}As^{5+}(As^{3+}_{0.5},Na_{0.5})Fe^{3+}Si_{6}B_{4}O_{40}F_{7}	Vicanite-(Ce)		trigonal	R3m	a=10.881 c=27.33	2,766	4.82	greenish yellow Uniaxial (-) n_{ω} = 1.757 n_{ε} = 1.722 Max birefringence δ = 0.035	
