= Fluorooxoborate =

Class of chemical compounds

Fluorooxoborate is one of a series of anions or salts that contain boron linked to both oxygen and fluorine. Several structures are possible, rings, or chains. They contain [BO_{x}F_{4−x}]^{(x+1)−} units BOF_{3}^{2−} BO_{2}F_{2}^{3−}, or BO_{3}F_{1}^{4−}. In addition there can be borate BO_{3} triangles and BO_{4} tetrahedrons. These can then be linked by sharing oxygen atoms, and when they do that, the negative charge is reduced. They are distinct from the fluoroborates in which fluorine is bonded to the metals rather than the boron atoms. For example, KBBF, KBe_{2}BO_{3}F_{2} is a fluoroborate and has more fluorine and oxygen than can be accommodated by the boron atom.

Common properties are a wide range of transparency from deep ultraviolet (DUV) to near infrared (NIR); non-linear optical response, meaning that a high-intensity light will have some power converted to double the frequency; birefringence. The transparency deep into the ultraviolet corresponds to a large band gap, whereby it takes a lot of energy to shift an electron in the material.

Compared to borates, fluorooxoborates are more likely to have lower dimensional structures such as layers or chains, as there are fewer oxygen connections available. Fluorooxoborates are more likely to be noncentrosymmetric as adding one fluorine atom to a boron reduces symmetry.

== Liquid state ==
When dissolved, the nature of the fluorooxoborate ions present depends on the boron to oxygen ratio. At the lowest oxygen levels BF_{4}^{−} exists, and is converted by oxygen to F_{3}BOBF_{3}^{2−}. With boron to oxygen ratios near 1, the cyclic B_{3}O_{3}F_{6}^{3−} ion predominates.

== Compounds ==
=== B_{1} ===
BaBOF_{3} contains a one-dimensional chain of -OBF_{2}O-^{−} and extra F^{−}

KBe_{2}BO_{3}F_{2} crystallises in layers with alanine. It has a monoclinic form with space group P2_{1} a=8.5800 b=4.9668 c =9.4146 Å, and β =116.563°.

=== B_{2} ===
SnB_{2}O_{3}F_{2} crystal system rhombohedral space group P3_{1}m 250 nm UV cutoff Z = 1, a = 4.5072 Å, c = 4.7624 Å; stable up to 325 °C. Above this it decomposes to BF_{3} boric oxide and Sn_{3}[B_{3}O_{7}]F.

PbB_{2}O_{3}F_{2} contains two-dimensional sheets of BFOB pairs connected by four oxygen atoms to adjacent units. crystal system rhombohedral space group P3_{1}m 220 nm UV cutoff

BaB_{2}O_{3}F_{2} contains a double chain of -BO-O-BF- The formula weight is 244.96. The crystal system is monoclinic space group P2_{1}. Unit cell dimensions are a=4.455 Å b=4.265 Å c=9.239 Å β=91.104° V=175.5 Å^{3} Z=2 density =4.635 g/cm3. Band gap 7.00 eV. It is stable up to 610 °C, but above that decomposes, giving off BF_{3} and forming BaB_{4O_{7}.}

BiB_{2}O_{_{4}}F contains one-dimensional chains.

BaCdBe_{2}(BO_{3})_{2}F_{2} to NaMgBe_{2}(BO_{3})_{2}F have ultraviolet absorption edges below 200 nm.

=== B_{3} ===
Na_{3}B_{3}O_{3}F_{6} contains isolated rings.

KB_{3}O_{4}F_{2} has a monoclinic crystal with space group P2_{1}/n with unit cell parameters a=4.6437 b=17.243 c=6.4301 β=102.660°. It contains one-dimensional [B_{3}O_{4}F_{2}]_{∞} chains which cause a high birefringence.

K_{3}B_{3}O_{3}F_{6} is monoclinic, space group P2_{1}/n, a=9.76 b=6.931 c=11.86 β=91.78 Z=12 volume=802 Å^{3} density=2.582. Melts at 432 °C.

Li_{2}B_{3}O_{4}F_{3} is an ionic conductor due to its large channels. It contains linear chains of B_{3}O_{4}F_{3} rings. Its crystal structure is orthorhombic with space group P2_{1}2_{1}2_{1}. Unit cell a=4.891, b=8.734, and c=12.301 Å. The subunit is a boroxine ring with tetrahedra BO_{2}F_{2} and BO_{3}F and a BO_{3} triangle. K_{2}B_{3}O_{4}F_{3}, KNaB_{3}O_{4}F_{3}, and KCsB_{3}O_{4}F_{3} form a similar structure but with space group Pbcn.

Cs_{3}B_{3}O_{3}F_{6} can be produced by heating CsBF_{4}, CsF, and H_{3}BO_{3} together at 300 °C. Crystals are orthorhombic with space group Pbcn, and with unit cell dimensions a=10.66 b=12.74 c=7.47 Å, and unit cell volume 1014 Å^{3}. The density is 3.884. It contains rings of B_{3}O_{3}F_{6}^{3-}.

Rb[B_{3}O_{3}F_{2}(OH)_{2}], Ph_{4}P[B_{3}O_{3}F_{2}(OH)_{2}] and Ph_{3}MeP[B_{3}O_{3}F_{2}(OH)_{2}] all have high birefringence. The Rb salt has unit cell a=14.569 b=6.084 c=9.828 β=129.825°.

NaB_{3}O_{4}F(OH) contains one-dimensional chains of B_{3}O_{4}F(OH). It has a monoclinic crystal structure with space group P2_{1}/_{c} number 14 with unit cell sizes a=5.7958 Å b=8.7348 Å c=9.5409 Å, and β=94.128°.[

[C(NH_{2})_{3}][B_{3}O_{3}F_{2}(OH)_{2}] and [C(NH_{2})_{3}]_{2}[B_{3}O_{3}F_{4}(OH)], guanidinium salts are non-linear optical materials. Ammonium, rubidium, and caesium salts also exist: NH_{4}[B_{3}O_{3}F_{4}(OH)], K_{2}Rb[B_{3}O_{3}F_{4}(OH)], Rb_{2}[B_{3}O_{3}F_{4}(OH)], Cs_{2}[B_{3}O_{3}F_{4}(OH)], RbCs_{5}[B_{3}O_{3}F_{4}(OH)]_{3}, Cs(NH_{4})_{3}[B_{3}O_{3}F_{4}(OH)]_{2}. Related substances include K_{2.3}Cs_{0.7}B_{3}O_{3}F_{6} (KCsBOF), and Cs_{3}[B_{3}O_{3}(OH)_{3}]Cl_{3}.

KB_{3}O_{4}F_{2} has a birefringence of 0.096 at 546 nm.

(NH_{4})[C(NH_{2})_{3}][B_{3}O_{3}F_{4}(OH)] has monclinic space group C2/c.

=== B_{4} ===
NH_{4}B_{4}O_{6}F, (ABF) RbB_{4}O_{6}F (RBF), CsB_{4}O_{6}F, (CBF) For the rubidium and ammonium compounds the structure is orthorhombic. It contains borate sheets with fluorine pointing up and down into the between layers that contains the cations NH_{4}, Rb or Cs. The units in the sheet are a BO_{3} triangle joined to a boroxine ring with an extra fluorine (B_{3}O_{6}F). Two oxygen atoms from the ring, and two from the triangle share with the adjacent units. The ammonium salt is stable to 300 °C, rubidium to 453 °C, and caesium to 609 °C.

KB_{3}O_{4}F_{2} has a monoclinic crystal with space group P2_{1}/n with unit cell parameters a=4.6437 b=17.243 c=6.4301 β=102.660°. It contains one-dimensional [B_{3}O_{4}F_{2}]_{∞} chains which cause a high birefringence.

KB_{4}O_{6}F is a hypothetical substance, predicted to have a short ultraviolet cut-off at 161 nm.

NaB_{4}O_{6}F contains [B_{4}O_{6}F]_{∞}. It produces a second harmonic from light. UV cut off is 180 nm. The structure contains stacked layers, that contain B_{3}O_{3} rings joined with BO_{3} triangles. A larger ring, part of 3 small rings and three triangles, with B_{9}O_{9} surrounds sodium atoms. A fluorine sticks out from each ring towards the sodium in the adjacent sheet. The crystal structure is monoclinic with space group C2. Formula weight 181.23; a = 11.39 Å b = 6.521 Å c = 8.030(6) Å β = 114.18° V=544.2 Z=4 Density=2.212; It decomposes by losing BF_{3} when heated to 400 °C; It is pyroelectric, but not ferroelectric

CaB_{4}O_{6}F_{2} SrB_{4}O_{6}F_{2} BaB_{4}O_{6}F_{2} The structure contains stacked layers, that contain B_{3}O_{3} rings joined with BO_{3} triangles. A larger ring, part of 3 small rings and three triangles, with B_{9}O_{9} surrounds the alkaline earth atoms. Two fluorine atoms stick out from each ring towards the metal in the adjacent sheet. Ca: formula weight 314.58; monoclinic P21/n, a=6.6384 Å, b=7.6733 Å, c=11.3385 Å, β=91.281°, V=579.31, Z=4, density=3.609

Cs_{4}B_{4}O_{3}F_{10} contains tetrafluoroborate and six-membered B_{3}O_{3}F_{6} rings. Its crystals are monoclinic and it has space group P2_{1}/c. It melts at 293 °C, the lowest for any fluorooxoborate compound.

=== B_{5} ===
CaB_{5}O_{7}F_{3}, Formula weight =263.13 Orthorhombic Cmc2_{1} a = 9.93 Å b = 8.40 Å c = 7.97 Å Volume= 664 Å^{3} Z=4 Density=2.631; The structure contains a repeating pattern of alternate tiles of double rings B_{5}O_{9}F_{3}. This has 4 protruding oxygen atoms that are shared with neighbours. A large B_{9}O_{9} ring encloses the calcium atom. These form sheets that are stacked on each other in the b direction. It is stable up to 640 °C.

SrB_{5}O_{7}F_{3} The crystal structure is orthorhombic with space group Cmc2_{1}. The subunits are double rings B_{5}O_{9}F_{3} which are fused at a boron and oxygen atom. There is a fluorine attached to this boron, and also to the boron atoms connected to the ring bridging oxygen. Four oxygen atoms connect from the outer boron atoms on the rings to join up with adjacent subunits to make a two-dimensional sheet. Optically it is a negative biaxial crystal. The birefringence is 0.070 at 1084 nm increasing to 0.075 at 400 nm. The ultraviolet cutoff limit is below 180 nm.

BaB_{5}O_{8}F·xH_{2}O with x≈0.17 Contains two boroxine rings interconnected at a common boron: B_{3}O_{5}^{2−} and B_{3}O_{4}F^{−}. This substance is transparent from 180 nm to 1000 nm (UV to NIR). Optically it is a positive biaxial. The birefringence is around 0.06 in the visible light region of the spectrum, but increases sharply in the UV t 0.093 at 200 nm. Crystal structure: Orthorhombic, Pbca a = 11.399 Å b = 9.429 Å c = 13.467(4) Å Volume 1447.4 Å^{3} Z=8, Calculated density = 3.133 g·cm^{‒3}

PbB_{5}O_{8}F This compound has a building block consisting of B_{5}O_{10}F^{6−} with a double boroxine ring with one shared boron. Each of the other boron atoms has a side oxygen connection that is shared with other of the building blocks. One of those boron atoms has a fluorine attached. The building block connect into two interpenetrating three-dimensional structures. The crystal structure is orthorhombic with space group Pbca; MW 408.24; a=10.885, b=9.108, c=13.576 Å, Z=8 Volume= 1345.9 Å^{3} Density = 2.938; It is a positive biaxial crystal; Birefringence is 0.0685 at 1064 nm (NIR) to 0.0737 at 400 nm. The band gap is 5.23.

PbB_{5}O_{7}F_{3} has a large birefringence and is a second harmonic generator.

Li_{2}Na_{0.9}K_{0.1}B_{5}O_{8}F_{2} contains a two dimensional sheet composed of units which are a pair of boroxine rings fused at one boron atom. Each ring has an extra fluorine atom, and shares two oxygen bridges to adjacent units.

=== B_{6} ===
LiB_{6}O_{9}F contains a unit with two boroxine rings linked with a shared oxygen. One ring has an extra fluorine, and each connects to two other units through shared oxygen. Crystal structure orthorhombic space group Pna21, a = 7.6555 Å, b = 8.5318 Å, c = 10.7894 Å, Z = 4

Li_{2}B_{6}O_{9}F_{2} has a three dimensional network which is composed of units with fused boroxine ring pairs connected to a BF_{2}O_{2} bridge. monoclinic space group Cc formula weight 260.74 a = 4.821 b = 16.149 c = 10.057 β = 92.003 V=782.5 Z=4 density=2.213. It is a lithium ion conductor.

Na_{2}B_{6}O_{9}F_{2} contains a unit with two boroxine rings linked with a shared oxygen. Each ring has an extra fluorine, and each connects to two other units through shared oxygen. Formula weight 292.84; monoclinic P2_{1}/c; a=8.196 b=13.001 c=7.896 β=90.750° V =841.3, Z=4.

K_{3}B_{6}O_{9}F_{3}(KBF), two dimensional sheets composed of units that have a pair of boroxine rings fused at one boron, one links to a tetrahedron BF_{2}O_{2} bridge unit. The other ring has an extra fluorine atom and bridges via two oxygens to adjacent units. Crystal structure is monoclinic, space group P2_{1}/c formula weight 383.15; unit cell a=7.3898 b= 14.2142 c=10.2551Å β=93.419° Volume=1075.3 Z=4, density=2.367 band gap=6.98 eV. α-K_{3}B_{6}O_{9}F_{3} has space group P1C_{1} with unit cell a=7.2830 b=7.0577 c=10.2280 β=93.278°. Rb_{2}B_{6}O_{9}F(OH) is noncentrosymmetric.

K_{3}Ba_{3}Li_{2}Al_{4}B_{6}O_{20}F has formula weight 1054.98; It has hexagonal structure space group P6̅2c unit cell a=8.7547 c= 16.434 Å V=1090.8 Z=2

=== B_{7} ===
Na_{3}B_{7}O_{11}F_{2} Contains a pair of boroxine rings interlinked by another ring with OBF_{2}O. The outer pair of rings is linked with extra oxygen atoms at each end to form a ladder-shaped structure. It has orthorhombic structure with space group Pnma; formula weight 717.28 a=9.2659 b= 16.3431 c= 6.6326 Å Volume 1004.40 Å^{3} Z= 2 Density 2.372. It is transparent from 161 to 2500 nm.

=== B_{8} ===
CsKB_{8}O_{12}F_{2} It contains borate sheets with fluorine pointing up and down into the between layers which alternate with potassium in one layer and caesium in the other.

CsRbB_{8}O_{12}F_{2} It contains borate sheets with fluorine pointing up and down into the between layers which contain mixed rubidium and caesium.

=== B_{10} ===
K_{3}NaB_{10}O_{16}F_{2} has band gap 6.93 eV and birefringence Δn = 0.047 at 1064 nm. It has unit cell parameters a=12.0020 b=12.3563 c=11.9778 Å β=117.839° and space group C2/c.

CaB_{10}O_{14}F_{6}

SrB_{10}O_{14}F_{6}

=== B_{11} ===
K_{5}B_{11}O_{18}F_{2} has a B_{11}O_{21}F_{2} building block and contains 14-membered rings. Crystals are triclinic with a=6.6221 b=10.320 Å c=14.046 α=100.086° β=95.406° γ=108.192°.

=== B_{12} ===
Na_{2}BaB_{12}O_{18}F_{4} is transparent to under 190 nm. Its structure has two interpenetrating 3D networks made from BO_{3} and BO_{3}F units. Crystals are orthorhombic, with space group pbcn, and unit cell dimensions: a = 12.9697 Å b = 7.9476 Å c = 16.2560 Å.

K_{6}B_{12}O_{19}F_{4} has disorganised BO_{3} and BO_{4} units. It has space group Pnma with unit cell a = 15.291Å b = 7.707Å c = 8.672Å.

=== B_{13} ===
The compounds K_{10}B_{13}O_{15}F_{19} and Rb_{10}B_{13}O_{15}F_{19} contain B_{10}O_{12}F_{13}^{7−} and B_{3}O_{3}F_{6}^{3−} units.

== Heteropolyanions ==
Borates can condense with other oxoanions to make a heteropolyanion, and some of these are known to substitute oxygen with fluorine. For example BaB_{2}P_{2}O_{8}F_{2} is a fluoroborophosphate where fluorine is bonded to the boron. as a variation of borophosphate.
