= Borate sulfate =

Mixed anion compound containing separate borate and sulfate anions

Borate sulfates are mixed anion compounds containing separate borate and sulfate anions. They are distinct from the borosulfates where the borate is linked to a sulfate via a common oxygen atom.

== List ==
	chem	mw	crystal system	space group	unit cell Å	volume	density	comment	references
sulfoborite	Mg_{3}(OH)[B(OH)_{4}]_{2}(SO_{4})F		orthorhombic	Pnma	a=10.132, b=12.537, c=7.775	987.6		Biaxial (-) n_{α}=1.527, n_{β}=1.536, n_{γ}=1.551 2V 79° Max birefringence δ=0.024	
Heidornite	Na_{2}Ca_{3}B_{5}O_{8}(OH)_{2}(SO_{4})_{2}Cl		monoclinic	C2/c	a=10.19, b=7.76, c=18.81 β=93.33° Z=4	1,485	2.753	Biaxial (+) n_{α}=1.579, n_{β}=1.588, n_{γ}=1.604 2V 63° to 77° Max birefringence δ=0.025	
Charlesite	Ca_{6}Al(SO_{4})_{2}B(OH)_{4}(O,OH)_{12}·26H_{2}O		trigonal	P3_{1}c	a = 11.161, c = 21.212	2,288	1.77	Uniaxial (-) n_{ω}=1.492(3), n_{ε}=1.475(3) Max birefringence δ=0.017	
Vitimite	Ca_{6}B_{14}O_{19}(SO_{4})(OH)_{14}·5H_{2}O		monoclinic	P2/m	a=14.10, b=19.53, c=14.05 β=120.39° Z=4	3,337		Biaxial (-) n_{α}=1.532(3), n_{β}=1.537(1), n_{γ}=1.540(1) Max birefringence δ=0.008	
Harkerite	Ca_{12}Mg_{4}Al(BO_{3})_{3}(SiO_{4})_{4}(CO_{3})_{5}·H_{2}O		trigonal	R3̅m	a=18.131 α=33.46°	1,614		Uniaxial n_{α}=1.651±2, n_{β}=1.651±2	
Tatarinovite	Ca_{3}Al(SO_{4})[B(OH)_{4}](OH)_{6}·12H_{2}O		Hexagonal	P6_{3}	a=11.1110, c=10.6294	1,136	1.79	colourless Uniaxial (+) n_{ω}=1.475, n_{ε}=1.496 Max birefringence δ=0.021	
Sturmanite	Ca_{6}Fe^{3+}_{2}(SO_{4})_{2.5}[B(OH)_{4}](OH)_{12}·25H_{2}O		trigonal	P3_{1}c	a=11.16, c=21.79 Z=2	2,350		yellow Uniaxial (+/-) n_{ω}=1.499-1.500, n_{ε}=1.501±4 Max birefringence δ=0.002	
	[Ni(atta)(SO_{4})_{0.5}]·[B_{5}O_{6}(OH)_{4}]	514.13	monoclinic	P2_{1}/c	a=9.0512, b=15.2776, c=15.0142 β=90.325° Z=4	2076.14	1.645		
Buryatite	Ca_{3}(Si,Fe,Al)(SO_{4})[B(OH_{4})]O(OH)_{5}·12H_{2}O		trigonal	P3_{1}c	a=11.14, c=20.99 Z=4	2,256	1.89	Uniaxial (-) n_{ω}=1.523(3), n_{ε}=1.532(3) Max birefringence δ=0.009	
	Rb_{3}H(SO_{4})_{2}(B_{2}O_{3})_{2}		hexagonal	P6_{3}/m	a=6.502, c=19.02 Z=2		2.803		
Fontarnauite	Na_{2}Sr(SO_{4})B_{5}O_{8}(OH)·2H_{2}O		monoclinic	P2_{1}/c	a=6.458, b=22.299, c=8.571 β=103.05° Z=4	1,203			
	Y(SO_{4})[B(OH_{4})](H_{2}O)·H_{2}O		triclinic	P1̅	a=5.9679, b=6.8559, c=10.1698 α=79.608°, β=76.673°, γ=89.220° Z=2	398.02	2.502		
	Cs_{3}H(SO_{4})_{2}(B_{2}O_{3})_{2}		hexagonal	P6_{3}/m	a = 6.5648, c = 19.5669 Z = 2		3.322		
	La(SO_{4})[B(OH)_{4}](H_{2}O)	331.83	triclinic	P1̅	a=6.2808, b=6.8321, c=8.6830 α=82.475°, β=76.758°, γ=87.300° Z=2	359.51	3.065		
	La_{2}B_{3}O_{4}(OH)_{3}(SO_{4})_{2}		orthorhombic	Pna2_{1}	a=8.3986 b=6.9230 c=19.4065			SHG 0.1×KDP	
	Pr(SO_{4})[B(OH)_{4}](H_{2}O)_{2}	351.84	monoclinic	P2_{1}/m	a=6.2359, b=9.5542, c=6.8236 β=93.852° Z=2	405.64	2.881		
	Nd(SO_{4})[B(OH)_{4}](H_{2}O)_{2}	355.17	monoclinic	P2_{1}/m	a=6.2119, b=9.5328, c=6.7923 β=93.755° Z=2	401.35	2.939		
	Sm(SO_{4})[B(OH)_{4}](H_{2}O)	343.27	triclinic	P1̅	a=6.1467, b=6.7280, c=8.6068 α=81.769°, β=76.653°, γ=87.259° Z=2	342.71	3.326		
	Sm(SO_{4})[B(OH)_{4}](H_{2}O)_{2}	361.30	monoclinic	P2_{1}/m	a=6.1601, b=9.5416, c=6.7589 β=93.816° Z=2	396.39	3.027		
	Eu(SO_{4})[B(OH)_{4}](H_{2}O)	344.88	triclinic	P1̅	a=6.1205, b=6.7090, c=8.5844 α=81.713°, β=76.680°, γ=87.294° Z=2	339.40	3.375		
	Eu(SO_{4})[B(OH)_{4}](H_{2}O)_{2}	362.89	monoclinic	P2_{1}/m	a=6.1322, b=9.5139, c=6.7343 β=93.683° Z=2	392.08	3.074		
	Gd(SO_{4})[B(OH)_{4}](H_{2}O)_{2}	368.19	monoclinic	P2_{1}/m	a=6.1148, b=9.5078, c=6.7164 β=93.611° Z=2	389.70	3.138		
	Tb(SO_{4})[B(OH)_{4}](H_{2}O)·H_{2}O	369.87	triclinic	P1̅	a=6.0139, b=6.8972, c=10.1753 α=79.616°, β=76.590°, γ=89.106° Z=2	403.42	3.045		
	Dy(SO_{4})[B(OH)_{4}](H_{2}O)·H_{2}O	373.43	triclinic	P1̅	a=5.9880, b=6.8728, c=10.1638 α=79.652°, β=76.597°, γ=89.153° Z=2	400.12	3.100		
	Ho(SO_{4})[B(OH)_{4}](H_{2}O)·H_{2}O	375.86	triclinic	P1̅	a=5.9701, b=6.8570, c=10.1580 α=79.588°, β=76.636°, γ=89.193° Z=2	397.75	3.138		
	Er(SO_{4})[B(OH)_{4}](H_{2}O)·H_{2}O	378.19	triclinic	P1̅	a=5.9529, b=6.8401, c=10.1553 α=79.598°, β=76.642°, γ=89.198° Z=2	395.54	3.175		
	Tm(SO_{4})[B(OH)_{4}](H_{2}O)·H_{2}O	379.86	triclinic	P1̅	a=5.9289, b=6.8232, c=10.1422 α=79.531°, β=76.663°, γ=89.263° Z=2	392.40	3.215		
	Yb(SO_{4})[B(OH)_{4}](H_{2}O)·H_{2}O	383.97	triclinic	P1̅	a=5.9150, b=6.8090, c=10.1454 α=79.541°, β=76.669°, γ=89.243° Z=2	390.82	3.263		
	Lu(SO_{4})[B(OH)_{4}](H_{2}O)·H_{2}O	385.91	triclinic	P1̅	a=5.8992, b=6.7954, c=10.1322 α=79.551°, β=76.691°, γ=89.266° Z=2	388.53	3.299		
	Pb_{2}[(BO_{2})(OH)](SO_{4})	570.26	monoclinic	P2_{1}/m	a=6.982, b=5.3917, c=8.167 β=98.643°	303.9	6.231	decompose 335 °C (635 °F); band gap 4.08 eV	
	Pb_{4}(BO_{3})_{2}(SO_{4})	1042.44	monoclinic	P2_{1}/c	a=6.9363, b=15.8784, c=9.6053 β=110.770° Z=4	989.15	7.000	melt 689 °C (1,272 °F); band gap 4.03 eV	
	Na_{2}PbB_{6}O_{10}SO_{4}		orthorhombic	Pnma	a=12.9566, b=9.9289, c=7.8800 Z=4	1013.7	3.762		
	Ca_{2.58}Pb_{0.42}B_{6}O_{11}SO_{4}		monoclinic	P12_{1}/c1	a=6.4716, b=17.2900, c=9.1455 β=90.411° Z=4	1023.30	3.423		
