= Zunyite =

Sorosilicate mineral

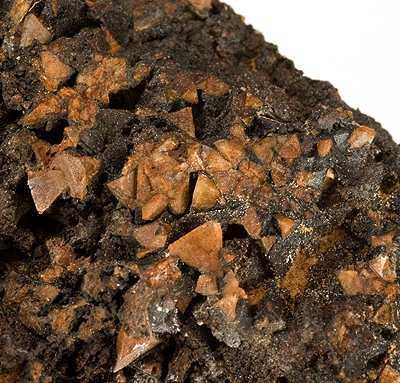
- Sharp, pyramids of brown-red zunyite from Silver City, Tintic District, East Tintic Mountains, Juab County, Utah, US (size: 5.5 x 5 x 3.5 cm)

General
- Category: Sorosilicates
- Formula: Al_{13}Si_{5}O_{20}(OH,F)_{18}Cl
- IMA symbol: Znu
- Strunz classification: 9.BJ.55
- Crystal system: Isometric
- Crystal class: Hextetrahedral (4̅3m); H-M symbol: (4̅3m)
- Space group: F4̅3m
- Unit cell: a = 13.8654 - 13.8882 Å; Z = 4

Identification
- Color: Grayish white, flesh-red; colorless in thin section
- Crystal habit: Crystalline - occurs as well-formed fine sized crystals
- Twinning: On {111}, contact and penetration
- Cleavage: Good on {111}
- Fracture: Uneven
- Tenacity: Brittle
- Mohs scale hardness: 7
- Luster: Vitreous
- Streak: White
- Diaphaneity: Transparent to translucent with inclusions
- Specific gravity: 2.874(5) (meas.) 2.87 - 2.90 (calc.)
- Optical properties: Isotropic
- Refractive index: n = 1.592 - 1.600
- Other characteristics: May fluoresce red under UV

Zunyite is a sorosilicate mineral, Al_{13}Si_{5}O_{20}(OH,F)_{18}Cl, composed of aluminium, silicon, hydrogen, chlorine, oxygen, and fluorine.

== Occurrence ==
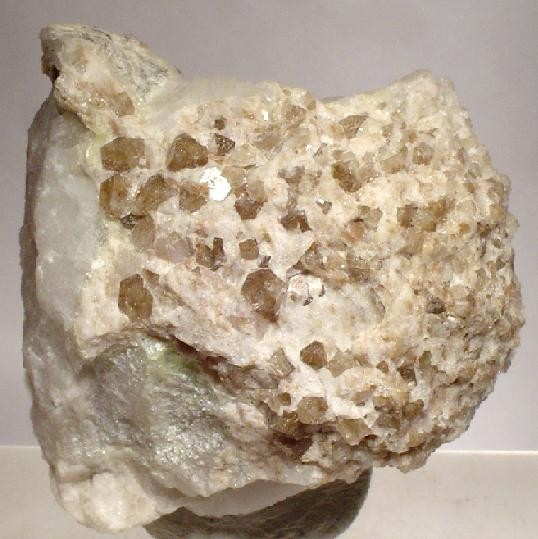
Glassy, translucent, gray-tan, pseudohexagonal zunyite crystals on a milky quartz matrix. From the Big Bertha Mine, Dome Rock Mountains, La Paz County, Arizona (size: 3.3 x 3.2 x 2.8 cm))

Zunyite occurs in highly aluminous shales and hydrothermally altered volcanic rocks. It occurs in association with pyrophyllite, kaolinite, alunite, diaspore, rutile, pyrite, hematite and quartz.

It was discovered in 1884, and named for its discovery site, the Zuni mine in the Silverton District, San Juan County, Colorado.
