= Tienshanite =

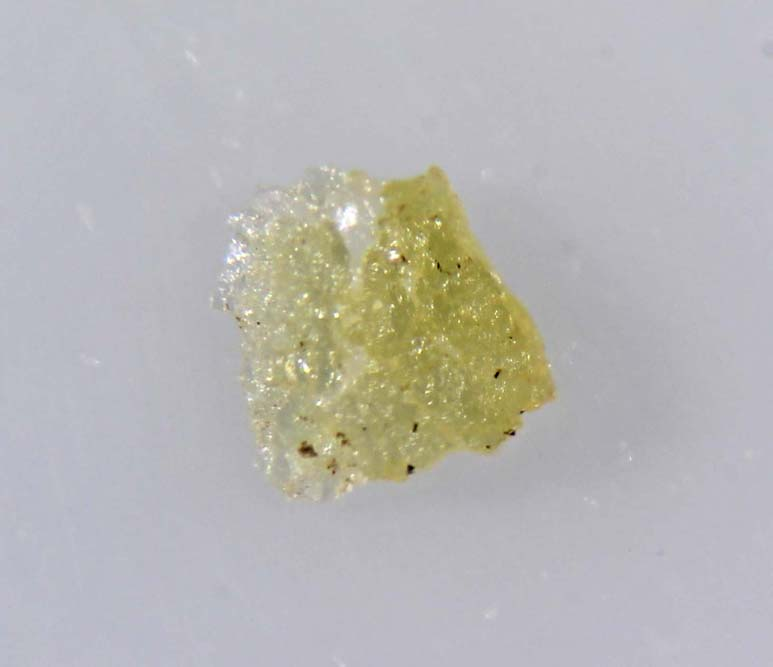

General
- Category: Cyclosilicate
- Formula: KNa_{3}(Na,K,[])_{6}(Ca,Y,RE)_{2}Ba_{6}(Mn^{2+},Fe^{2+},Zn,Ti)_{6}(Ti,Nb)_{6}Si_{36}B_{12}O_{114}[O_{5.5}(OH,F)_{3.5}]F_{2}
- IMA symbol: Tsh
- Strunz classification: 9.CL.05
- Crystal system: Hexagonal
- Crystal class: Dipyramidal (6/m); H-M symbol: (6/m)
- Space group: Hexagonal; Space group: P6/m

Identification
- Color: olive-green
- Mohs scale hardness: 6 – 6 1/2
- Luster: vitreous

Tienshanite, named for the Tian Shan Range in Mongolia, is a rare borosilicate mineral, though rock-forming in some parts of its original locality at the Dara-i-Pioz Glacier in Tajikistan. Its formula is extremely complex: KNa_{3}(Na,K,[])_{6}(Ca,Y,RE)_{2}Ba_{6}(Mn^{2+},Fe^{2+},Zn,Ti)_{6}(Ti,Nb)_{6}Si_{36}B_{12}O_{114}[O_{5.5}(OH,F)_{3.5}]F_{2}.
