= Borate chloride =

The borate chlorides are chemical compounds that contain both borate ions and chloride ions. They are mixed anion compounds. Many of them are minerals. Those minerals that crystallise with water (hydrates) may be found in evaporite deposits formed when mineral water has dried out.

== List ==
	Chemical formula	Molar mass (g/mol)	Crystal system	Space group	Unit cell (Å)	Volume (Å^{3})	Density (g/cm^{3})	Comment	References
Teepleite	Na_{2}[B(OH)_{4}]Cl		tetragonal	P4/nmm	a = 7.25, c = 4.84	254.4	2.076	Colourless, white or light beige crystals, with a vitreous, greasy, or dull lustre. Uniaxial (-) n_{ω} = 1.519 n_{ε} = 1.503 Max birefringence δ = 0.016	
Boracite	Mg_{3}(B_{7}O_{13})Cl		orthorhombic	Pca2_{1}	a = 8.577, b = 8.553, c = 12.09 Z=4	992.5	2.95	Green, dark green (ferroan), blue, colourless, grey or white crystals with an adamantine, vitreous lustre if transparent. Biaxial (+) n_{α} = 1.658 - 1.662 n_{β} = 1.662 - 1.667 n_{γ} = 1.668 - 1.673 2V 82° Max birefringence δ = 0.010 - 0.011	
Karlite	Mg_{7}(BO_{3})_{3}(OH,Cl)_{5}		orthorhombic		a = 17.92, b = 17.6, c = 3.1	978	2.80	White to light green crystals with a silky lustre. Biaxial (-) n_{α} = 1.589 n_{β} = 1.632 n_{γ} = 1.634 2V 24° Max birefringence δ = 0.045	
Shabynite	Mg_{5}(BO_{3})(OH)_{5}(Cl,OH)_{2}·4H_{2}O		monoclinic				2.32	Colourless or white crystals with a silky lustre. Biaxial (-) n_{α} = 1.543 n_{β} = 1.571 n_{γ} = 1.577 2V 49° Max birefringence δ = 0.034	
Satimolite	KNa_{2}Mg_{2}Al_{5}[B_{12}O_{18}(OH)_{12}](OH)_{6}Cl_{4}·4H_{2}O		trigonal	R3̅m	a = 15.1431, c = 14.456 Z=3		2.1	White to colorless crystals with a vitreous or dull lustre. Biaxial (-) n_{α} = 1.535 n_{β} = 1.552 n_{γ} = 1.553 2V 26° Max birefringence δ = 0.018	
Kalborsite	K_{6}Al_{4}BSi_{6}O_{20}(OH)_{4}Cl		Tetragonal		a = 9.85, c = 13.06	1,267	2.5	Colorless with a slight rose-brownish tint crystals with a vitreous or pearly lustre. Uniaxial (+) n_{ω} = 1.525 n_{ε} = 1.525 ? Max birefringence δ = 0.000	
Hilgardite	Ca_{2}B_{5}O_{9}Cl·H_{2}O		triclinic	P1	a=6.463 b=6.564 c=6.302 α = 61°38', β = 118°46', γ = 105°47' Z=1	205.8	2.67 to 2.71	Colorless, light pink crystals with a vitreous lustre.	
Solongoite	Ca_{2}(H_{3}B_{3}O_{7})(OH)Cl		monoclinic		a = 7.93, b = 7.26, c = 12.54 β = 94°	720	2.514	Colourless crystals with a vitreous lustre. Biaxial (+) n_{α} = 1.510 n_{β} = 1.510 n_{γ} = 1.545 Max birefringence δ = 0.035	
Ekaterinite	Ca_{2}(B_{4}O_{7})(Cl,OH)_{2}·2H_{2}O		hexagonal		a = 11.86, c = 23.88	2,909	2.440	White or white with slight rose tint crystals with a pearly lustre. Uniaxial (-) n_{ω} = 1.577 n_{ε} = 1.574 Max birefringence δ = 0.003	
Chelkarite	CaMgB_{2}O_{4}(Cl,OH)_{2}·5H_{2}O or near Cl:OH = 3:1		orthorhombic		a = 13.69, b = 20.84, c = 8.26	2,357	2.21	Colorless crystals. Biaxial (+) n_{α} = 1.520 n_{γ} = 1.558 Max birefringence δ = 0.038	
Sakhaite	Ca_{48}Mg_{16}(BO_{3})_{32}(CO_{3})_{16}·2(H_{2}O,HCl)		isometric	Fd3̅m	a = 14.685 Z=4	3166.8	2.78 - 2.83	Colourless, gray to grayish white crystals with a greasy lustre.	
Hydrochlorborite	Ca_{4}B_{8}O_{15}Cl_{2}·21H_{2}O		monoclinic		a = 22.78, b = 8.74, c = 17.06 β = 96.7°	3373	1.83 - 1.85	Colorless crystals with a vitreous, dull lustre. Biaxial (+) n_{α} = 1.499 n_{β} = 1.502 n_{γ} = 1.521 2V 45° Max birefringence δ = 0.022	
Heidornite	Na_{2}Ca_{3}B_{5}O_{8}(OH)_{2}(SO_{4})_{2}Cl		monoclinic	C2/c	a = 10.19, b = 7.76, c = 18.81 β = 93.33° Z=4	1,485	2.753	Colorless crystals with a vitreous lustre. Biaxial (+) n_{α} = 1.579 n_{β} = 1.588 n_{γ} = 1.604 2V 63° to 77° Max birefringence δ = 0.025	
Volkovskite	KCa_{4}[B_{5}O_{8}OH]_{4}[B(OH)_{3}]_{2}Cl·4H_{2}O		triclinic	P1	a = 6.57, b = 23.92, c = 6.52 α = 90.58°, β = 119.1°, γ = 95.56°	889.2	2.27	Colourless or pink; varying from pale to deep orange crystals with a vitreous lustre. Biaxial (+) n_{α} = 1.523 - 1.539 n_{β} = 1.539 - 1.540 n_{γ} = 1.596 - 1.605 2V 14.6° Max birefringence δ = 0.073	
Kurgantaite	CaSr[B_{5}O_{9}]Cl·H_{2}O		triclinic	P1	a = 6.5732, b = 6.4445, c = 6.3693, α = 60.995°, β = 61.257°, γ = 77.191° Z=1		2.99	Colourless to white crystals with a vitreous lustre.	
Chambersite	(Mn^{2+})_{3}(B_{7}O_{13})Cl		orthorhombic	Pca2_{1}	a = 8.68, b = 8.68, c = 12.26 Z=4	924	3.49	Colorless to deep purple crystals with a vitreous lustre. Biaxial (+) n_{α} = 1.732 n_{β} = 1.737 n_{γ} = 1.744 2V 83° Max birefringence δ = 0.012	
Ericaite	(Fe^{2+})_{3}(B_{7}O_{13})Cl		orthorhombic		a = 8.58, b = 8.65, c = 12.17	903	3.17 - 3.27	Red, green, purple, brown or black crystals. Biaxial (-) n_{α} = 1.731 n_{β} = 1.755 n_{γ} = 1.755 Max birefringence δ = 0.024	
Congolite	(Fe^{2+},Mg)_{3}[B_{7}O_{13}]Cl		trigonal	R3c	a = 8.62, c = 21.05	1355	3.58	Pale red or pink crystals. Uniaxial (-) n_{ω} = 1.755 n_{ε} = 1.731 Max birefringence δ = 0.024	
Trembathite	(Mg,Fe^{2+})_{3}[B_{7}O_{13}]Cl		trigonal		a = 8.57, c = 20.99	1335	2.84 - 3.34	Colourless to pale blue transparent crystals with a vitreous lustre. Uniaxial (-) n_{ω} = 1.684 n_{ε} = 1.668 Max birefringence δ = 0.016	
Bandylite	Cu^{2+}[B(OH)_{4}]Cl		tetragonal	P4/nmm	a = 6.19 Å, c = 5.61 Z=2	214.9	2.81	Deep blue crystals with greenish portions; cendre blue to Italian blue, becoming greener with atacamite inclusions, with a vitreous or pearly lustre. Uniaxial (-) n_{ω} = 1.691 - 1.692 n_{ε} = 1.640 - 1.641 Max birefringence δ = 0.051	
	Li_{3}B_{8}O_{13}Cl	350.75	Otrhorhombic	Pca2_{1}	a=17.229 b=9.3827 c=6.6452 Z=4	1074.25	2.169	birefringence 0.094 at 1064 nm	
	Na_{4}[B_{6}O_{9}(OH)_{3}](H_{2}O)Cl		Otrhorhombic	Pca2_{1}	a=15.4867 b=8.6867 c=8.8551 Z=2	1191.3	2.260	SHG 0.4 × KDP	
	Mg_{3}B_{7}O_{13}Cl	392.05	orthorhombic	Pca2_{1}	a=8.5319 b=8.5282 c=12.0730 Z=4	878.45	2.964	NLO	
	KZn_{2}BO_{3}Cl_{2}		trigonal	R32				NLO SHG 1.3 × KDP	
	Ag_{4}B_{7}O_{12}Cl	734.6	triclinic	P1̅	a=8.7394 b=8.7881 c=9.1381 α=65.625° β=77.269° γ=61.173° Z=2	562			
	RbZn_{2}BO_{3}Cl_{2}	345.92	trigonal	R32	a=4.965 c=27.21			NLO SHG 1.17 × KDP	
	Sn_{3}B_{3}O_{7}Cl		orthorhombic	Pna2_{1}	a=9.5239 b=7.5804 c=12.3065 Z=4	1825	4.007	SHG 0.5 × of KDP	
	Sn_{3}B_{10}O_{17}Cl_{2}		orthorhombic	Pbcn	a =19.1905 b=10.3893 c=8.5164			UV cutoff 280 nm; birefringence 0.125 at 546 nm	
	Ba_{6}BO_{3}Cl_{9}	1201.90	monoclinic	P2_{1}/n	a=8.229 b=12.259 c=19.080 β=90.20 Z=4	1924.7	4.418	colourless	
	NaBa_{4}Al_{2}B_{8}O_{18}Cl_{3}		tetragonal	P4_{2}nm	a = 12.048, c = 6.817			NLO	
	NaBa_{4}(GaB_{4}O_{9})_{2}Cl_{3}	1192.62	tetragonal	P4_{2}nm	a=12.1033 c=6.8329 Z=2	1001.0	3.957	SHG 1.5xKDP	
	Rb_{4}Ba_{2.5}B_{20}O_{34}Cl	1481.10	triclinic	P1̅	a=6.756 b=11.086 c=11.288 α=99.07° β=90.60° γ=100.38° Z=1	820.6	2.9965	colourless	
	La(BO_{2})_{2}Cl		triclinic						
	LaB_{4}O_{6}(OH)_{2}Cl		monoclinic	Cc	a=6.5144 b=11.2478 c=9.7879 β=105.227° Z=4	692.01	3.337	SHG 2.3 × KDP;m UV edge <180 nm	
	Cs_{2}La_{2}B_{10}O_{17}Cl_{4}	1065.54	monoclinic	Cm	a=8.6904 b=20.92 c=6.4231 β =104.003 Z=2	1126.15	3.142	SHG 2.1xKDP	
	Ce(BO_{2})_{2}Cl		triclinic	P1̅	a = 4.2174; b = 6.5763; c = 8.1221 α = 82, 152; β = 89, 206; γ = 72.048°; Z = 2				
	Ce_{3}[BO_{3}]_{2}Cl_{3}		hexagonal	P6_{3}/m	a = 9.2008, c = 5.8079; Z = 2				
	CeB_{4}O_{6}(OH)_{2}Cl		monoclinic	Cc	a=6.4949 b=11.200 c=9.714 β=105.202° Z=4	681.9	3.398	2.1 × KDP	
	Pr(BO_{2})_{2}Cl		triclinic						
	Sm_{4}[B_{16}O_{26}(OH)_{4}(H_{2}O)_{3}Cl_{4}]								
	Eu_{4}[B_{16}O_{26}(OH)_{4}(H_{2}O)_{3}Cl_{4}]								
	Gd_{4}[B_{16}O_{26}(OH)_{4}(H_{2}O)_{3}Cl_{4}]								
	Pb_{6}BO_{4}Cl_{7}	1566	triclinic	P1̅	a=8.001 b=8.054 c=13.116 α=89.52 β=89.66 γ=69.942	793.9	6.551	colourless	
	Pu[B_{4}O_{6}(OH)_{2}Cl]		monoclinic	Cc	a=6.4898 b=11.174 c=9.6183 β=105.15°				
	Pu_{2}[B_{13}O_{19}(OH)_{5}Cl_{2}(H_{2}O)_{3}]		monoclinic	P2_{1}/n	a=8.0522 b=14.568 c=9.82 β=90.12°				
	Pu_{4}[B_{16}O_{26}(OH)_{4}(H_{2}O)_{3}Cl_{4}]								
	Am[B_{9}O_{13}(OH)_{4}]·H_{2}O		monoclinic	P2_{1}/n	a=7.703Å b=16.688Å c=9.872 β=90.073°				
	Am_{4}[B_{16}O_{26}(OH)_{4}(H_{2}O)_{3}Cl_{4}]								
	Cm_{2}[B_{14}O_{20}(OH)_{7}(H_{2}O)_{2}Cl]		monoclinic	P2_{1}/n	a=7.9561 b=14.212 c=9.836 β=90.013°				
	Cm_{4}[B_{16}O_{26}(OH)_{4}(H_{2}O)_{3}Cl_{4}]								
	Cf_{4}[B_{16}O_{26}(OH)_{4}(H_{2}O)_{3}Cl_{4}]								
