= Boroselenite =

The boroselenites are heteropoly anion chemical compounds containing selenite and borate groups linked by common oxygen atoms. They are not to be confused with the boroselenates with have a higher oxidation state for selenium, and extra oxygen. If selenium is replaced by sulfur, it would be a borosulfite. Boroselenites are distinct from selenoborates in which selenium replaces oxygen in borate, or perselenoborates which contain Se-Se bonds as well as Se-B bonds. The metal boroselenites were only discovered in 2012.

== List ==
name	chem	mw	crystal system	space group	unit cell Å	volume	density	comment	references
boroseleniteselenate	B_{2}Se_{3}O_{10}		monoclinic	P2_{1}/c	a = 4.3466, b = 7.0237, c = 22.1460, β = 94.922; Z = 4				
	Se_{2}B_{2}O_{7}	291.54	orthorhombic	P2_{1}2_{1}2_{1}	a=7.4815 b=7.8984 c=9.0478 Z=4	534.65	3.622	NLO 2.2 x KDP; band gap 4.64 eV; colourless	
	Li_{2}SeB_{8}O_{15}	419.32	monoclinic	P2_{1}/c	a=8.641 b=16.282 c=8.415 β=94.426 Z=4	1180.4	2.350	3D;stable to 280 °C; band gap 4.81 eV	
	NaSeB_{3}O_{7}	246.38	monoclinic	P2_{1}/c	a=4.470 b=15.810 c=8.645 β=98.75 Z=4	603.8	2.710	layered;stable to 290 °C; band gap 4.36	
	KSeB_{3}O_{7}	262.49	monoclinic	P2_{1}/c	a=4.5569 b=17.601 c=8.669 β=95.92 Z=4	691.6	2.521	layered stable to 280 °C; band gap 4.30	
	K_{2}Se_{3}B_{2}O_{10}	496.70	orthorhombic	Pnma	a=14.1842 b=15.7516 c=4.7103 Z=4	1052.39	3.135	1D; stable to 330 °C; band gap 4.75 eV	
	RbSe_{3}B_{2}O_{9}(OH)		orthorhombic	P2_{1}2_{1}2_{1}	a=4.6591 b=11.9288 c=16.332 Z=2	907.7	3.695	band gap 3.79 eV	
	CsSe_{3}B_{2}O_{9}(OH)		orthorhombic	P2_{1}2_{1}2_{1}	a=4.671 b=12.236 c=16.417 Z=2	1104.84	3.911	band gap 4.17 eV; SHG 0.8 x KDP	
	Bi_{2}[B_{2}(SeO_{3})_{6}]	600.67	monoclinic	P2_{1}/c	a=7.4594 b=7.5056 c=13.2486 β=90.04 Z=4	741.75	5.379	birefringence at 1064 nm is 0.090; 0D	
