= Borophosphate =

The borophosphates are mixed anion compounds containing borate and phosphate anions, which may be joined together by a common oxygen atom. Compounds that contain water or hydroxy groups can also be included in the class of compounds.

Borophosphates can be classified by whether or not they are hydrated, and the anion structure, which can be single, double, triple, isolated ring, isolated branched ring, simple chain, branched chain, loop chain, layers, or three-dimensional network. The isolated anion compounds are the borate phosphates, which contain separate borate and phosphate groups. Some of the borophosphate structures resemble silicates.

Related compounds include aluminophosphates, which have aluminium instead of boron, gallophosphates, with gallium in place of boron, and by substituting the phosphate: boroarsenates, boroantimonates, and vanadoborates.

== Formation ==
Borophosphates can be formed by heating compounds together at up to 900 °C. The products are dense, anhydrous, and do not contain organic substances.

Solvothermal synthesis uses a non water solvent such as ethylene glycol to dissolve the product.

The flux method crystallises from a molten flux of boric acid and sodium dihydrogen phosphate at around 171 °C.

The hydrothermal method heats the ingredients with water under pressure up to 200 °C. The ingredients are boric acid, phosphoric acid, metal salts, or organic bases. Products often contain hydrogen.

The ionothermal synthesis method uses an ionic liquid such as 1-alkyl-3-methylimidazolium bromide as a solvent. This can be done at atmospheric pressure and temperatures under 100 °C.

== Characteristics ==
Borophosphate compounds have been investigated for magnetic, electrical, optical and catalytic properties. Some borophosphates are porous and so have surface for interaction on their interiors, not just their surface. They can reversibly absorb water, or have channels that can allow ions to conduct. The reflection of a labelled tetrahedron cannot be superimposed (even with rotation or movements), so the compounds containing phosphate and borate tetrahedrons can be non-centrosymmetric, or chiral.

== List ==
name	formula	crystal system	space group	unit cell Å	volume	density	comment	refs
	Li[B_{3}PO_{6}(OH)_{3}]						looped chain B_{3}O_{3} rings OH on B and P	
	Li_{2}B_{3}PO_{8}		P1̅					
	Li_{3}BP_{2}O_{8}		P1̅					
	NH_{4}BeBP_{2}O_{8}·1/3H_{2}O	cubic	P2_{1}3				zeolite-ANA structure	
	(NH_{4})_{2}[B_{3}PO_{7}(OH)_{2}]						looped chain B_{3}O_{3} rings OH on B	
	(NH_{4})_{2}B_{2}P_{3}O_{11}(OH)	monoclinic	P2_{1}/c	a=15.774 b=7.5213 c=8.9661 β=106.93° Z=4	1020.0	2.238		
	(NH_{4})_{2}B_{2}P_{3}O_{11}(OH)	orthorhombic	P2_{1}2_{1}2_{1}	a=4.509 b = 14.49 c = 16.40 Z=4	1072	2.130	colourless	
	(NH_{4})_{3}H_{2}[BOB(PO_{4})_{3}]						infinite chains	
	(NH_{4})_{4}[H_{2}B_{2}P_{4}O_{16}]	tetragonal	P4_{1}2_{1}2					
	(NH_{4})_{2}BP_{2}O_{7}(OH)	tetragonal	P4_{1}2_{1}2	a=7.2162 c=14.8258 Z=4	772.03	2.046		
	(NH_{4})[B_{4}O_{5}(PO_{4})]	orthorhombic	Pbca	Z = 8 a = 8.200 b = 13.336 c = 13.4682			colourless	
	Na_{2}[BP_{2}O_{7}(OH)]	orthorhombic	Pna2_{1}	a=6.8236, b=20.7911, c=13.1446, Z=12			layers	
	Na_{3}B_{6}PO_{13}	orthorhombic	Pnma	a=9.3727, b=16.2307, c=6.7232, Z=4			8 member rings	
	Na_{3}BP_{2}O_{8}	monoclinic	C2/c	a=12.567, b=10.290, c=10.210, β=92.492, Z=2			infinite chains	
	Na_{5}[BOB(PO_{4})_{3})]						infinite chains	
	NaBeBP_{2}O_{8}·1/3H_{2}O	cubic	P2_{1}3				zeolite-ANA structure	
	Na_{13}(H_{2}O)_{2}[B_{6}P_{11}O_{42}(OH)_{2}]Cl_{2}·H_{2}O		F23					
	MgBPO_{4}(OH)_{2}		P3_{1}21					
dimagnesium (monohydrogenmonophosphatedihydrogenmonoboratemonophosphate)	Mg_{2}[BP_{2}O_{7}(OH)_{3}]	triclinic	P1	a=6.452, b=6.455, c=8.360, α=82.50, β=82.56, γ=80.98, Z=1	338.8		triple	
	(H_{3}O)Mg(H_{2}O)_{2}[BP_{2}O_{8}]·H_{2}O		P6_{1}22					
	Mg_{3}(H_{2}O)_{6}(B(OH)_{3}PO_{4})_{2}						double	
	LiMg(H_{2}O)_{2}[BP_{2}O_{8}]·H_{2}O		P6_{5}22					
	NaMg(H_{2}O)_{2}[BP_{2}O_{8}]•H_{2}O	hexagonal	P6_{1}22	a=9.428, c=15.820			loop branched chain	
	Na_{2}[MgB_{3}P_{2}O_{11}(OH)]·2/3H_{2}O	hexagonal	P6_{3}	a=11.771, c=12.100, Z=6		2.537	colourless	
	Na_{3}[Al_{2}B_{6}P_{4}O_{22}(OH)_{3}](H_{2}O)_{6}	orthorhombic	Cmca	a=6.9493 b=14.5529 c=24.027				
	Na_{3}[Al_{2}BP_{2}O_{11}](H_{2}O)_{0.5}	cubic	I23	a=19.7822				
	K_{2}B_{2}P_{2}O_{9}	orthorhombic	P2_{1}2_{1}2_{1}	a=7.8227 b=8.1393 c=12.925 Z=4	822.9	2.468		
	K_{2}BP_{2}O_{7}(OH)	orthorhombic	P2_{1}2_{1}2_{1}	a=7.068 b=7.2396 c=14.116 Z=4	722.3	2.574		
	K_{3}B_{4}PO_{10}	triclinic	P1̅	a=6.546, b=6.567, c=12.930, α=86.04, β=81.40, γ=60.42, Z=2	477.9	2.443	colourless 2D sheet	
	K_{7}B_{2}P_{5}O_{19}							
	K_{3}[B_{5}PO_{10}(OH)_{3}]						loop branch	
	LiK_{2}BP_{2}O_{8}		P2_{1}/n					
	Li_{3}K_{2}BP_{4}O_{14}		Cmca					
	KBeBP_{2}O_{8}·1/3H_{2}O	cubic	P2_{1}3	a=12.427, Z=12	1,919		zeolite-ANA structure	
	K_{2}Na_{3}B_{2}P_{3}O_{13}	orthorhombic	Cmc2_{1}	a = 13.924 b = 6.7673 c = 12.130 Z = 4			B_{2}P_{3}O_{13} chain	
	KNa_{4}B_{2}P_{3}O_{13}		Pna2_{1}	a=6.7419 b=13.9204 c=11.9078 Z=4	1117.55	2.696	SHG 0.4 × KDP; transparent >190 nm	
	KMg(H_{2}O)_{2}[BP_{2}O_{8}]•H_{2}O	hexagonal	P6_{1}22	a=9.463, c=15.815			loop branched chain	
	Ca[BPO_{5}]						loop branch B_{2}PO_{3} rings	
	Sc(H_{2}O)_{2}[BP_{2}O_{8}]·H_{2}O	hexagonal	P6_{5}22	a=9.5752, c=15.8145, Z=6	1,255.7	2.378		
	Sc(H_{2}O)_{2}[BP_{2}O_{8}]	hexagonal	P6_{5}22	a=9.535, c=15.768, Z=6				
	NaSc[BP_{2}O_{6}(OH)_{3}]·HPO_{4}		P2_{1}/c					
	Ti_{2}[B(PO_{4})_{3}]	hexagonal	P6_{3}/m	a = 14.1761 c = 7.3949	1287.0			
	Ti[BP_{2}O_{7}(OH)_{3}]		I4_{1}/amd					
	V_{2}[B(PO_{4})_{3}]	hexagonal	P6_{3}/m	a = 13.9882 c = 7.4515	1262.7			
	(VO)_{2}BP_{2}O_{10}							
	Li_{3}V_{2}[BP_{3}O_{12}(OH)][HPO_{4}]		P2_{1}/c					
	Na_{2}[VB_{3}P_{2}O_{12}(OH)]·2.92H_{2}O		I-43m					
	NH_{4}V^{III}[BP_{2}O_{8}(OH)]	monoclinic	P2_{1}/c	a=9.425, b=8.269, c=9.697, β=102.26°, Z=4	738.5			
	[ImH_{2}]_{3.8}(H_{3}O)_{1.2}[(V^{IV}O)_{4}(BO)_{2}(PO_{4})_{5}]·0.3H_{2}O	monoclinic	C2/c	a=9.4737, b=22.144, c=17.219, β=105.936°, Z=4			layered	
	[enH_{2}]_{2}[Na(VO)_{10}B(O)_{2}(OPO_{3}H)_{2}}_{5}]·22.5H_{2}O							
	[trienH_{4}]_{4}H[NH_{4}(VO)_{12}{B(O)_{2}(OPO_{3})_{2}}_{6}]·14H_{2}O	orthorhombic	Pbca	a=21.45, b=16.315, c=29.65, Z=4	10378	1.920		
	[trienH_{4}]_{4}H[K(VO)_{12}{O_{3}POB(O)_{2}OPO_{3}}_{6}]·16H_{2}O	orthorhombic	Pbca	a=21.537, b=16.267, c=29.717, Z=4	10411	1.996		
	KV[BP_{2}O_{8}(OH)]	triclinic	P1̅					
	Cr_{2}[B(PO_{4})_{3}]		P6_{3}/m					
	Na{Cr[BP_{2}O_{7}(OH)_{3}]}	monoclinic	C2/c	a=10.4220, b=8.2468, c=9.2053, β=116.568°, Z=4	707.63			
	Na_{8}[Cr_{4}B_{12}P_{8}O_{44}(OH)_{4}][P_{2}O_{7}]·nH_{2}O		I23					
	Na_{11}K_{5}[NaCr_{8}B_{4}P_{12}O_{60}H_{8}]·H_{2}O		Pmnn					
	H_{2}Mn_{5}(H_{2}O)_{6}[BP_{2}O_{8}]_{4}•4H_{2}O	hexagonal	P6_{1}22	a=9.655, c=15.791, Z=1.5			pale pink	
	Mn[BPO_{4}(OH)_{2}]		P3_{2}21	a=7.5750, c=12.927, Z=6	642.37	3.020		
	LiMn(H_{2}O)_{2}[BP_{2}O_{8}(OH)]·H_{2}O		P6_{5}22					
	(NH_{4})Mn(H_{2}O)_{2}(BP_{2}O_{8})·H_{2}O		P6_{5}22	a = 9.6559, c = 15.7939	1275.3			
	[NH_{4}]_{4}[Mn_{9}B_{2}(OH)_{2}(HPO_{4})_{4}(PO_{4})_{6}]	monoclinic	C2/c	a=32.603, b=10.617, c=10.718, β=108.26°, Z=4	3523	2.971	light pink	
	(NH_{4})_{6}[Mn_{3}B_{6}P_{9}O_{36}(OH)_{3}]·4H_{2}O		C2					
	(NH_{4})_{7}Mn_{4}(H_{2}O)[B_{2}P_{4}O_{15}(OH)_{2}]_{2}[H_{2}PO_{4}][HPO_{4}]		Pnma					
	(C_{3}H_{12}N_{2})[MnB_{2}P_{3}O_{12}(OH)]							
	(C_{4}H_{12}N_{2})[MnB_{2}P_{3}O_{12}(OH)]		Ima2					
	NaMn(H_{2}O)_{2}[BP_{2}O_{8}]•H_{2}O	hexagonal	P6_{1}22	a=9.589, c=15.939			loop branched chain	
	Na_{5}(H_{3}O){Mn_{3}[B_{3}O_{3}(OH)]_{3}(PO_{4})_{6}}·2H_{2}O	hexagonal	P6_{3}/m	a=11.9683, c=12.1303, Z=2				
	Na_{5}(NH_{4})Mn_{3}[B_{9}P_{2}O_{33}(OH)_{3}]·3/2H_{2}O		P6_{3}					
	Na_{2}[MnB_{3}P_{2}O_{11}(OH)]·2/3H_{2}O	hexagonal	P6_{3}	a=11.940, c=12.098, Z=6		2.670	colourless	
	KMnBP_{2}O_{7}(OH)_{2}	monoclinic	P2_{1}/c	a=6.659, b=12.049, c=9.790, β=109.12°, Z=4	742.2		orange-red luminescence	
	KMn(H_{2}O)_{2}[BP_{2}O_{8}]•H_{2}O	hexagonal	P6_{1}22	a=9.639, c=15.931			loop branched chain	
	K_{5}Mn_{2}B_{2}P_{5}O_{19}(OH)_{2}		P2_{1}/n					
	Fe^{III}_{2}[B(PO_{4})_{3}]		P6_{3}/m					
	Fe[B_{2}P_{2}O_{7}(OH)_{5}]	monoclinic	C2/c	a=17.745, b=6.720, c=7.059, β=109.01°, Z=4	796	2.808	unbranched chain	
	Fe(H_{2}O)_{2}BP_{2}O_{8}·H_{2}O	hexagonal		a=9.4583, c=15.707, Z=6	1216.9	2.543		
	Fe[BPO_{4}(OH)_{2}]		P3_{2}21	a=7.4844, c=12.844, Z=6	623.06	3.129		
	Fe^{II}(H_{2}O)_{2}[B_{2}P_{2}O_{8}(OH)_{2}]·H_{2}O		P2_{1}/c					
	Fe_{1.834}^{II}Fe_{0.166}^{III}B_{0.5}[PO_{3}(OH)]_{0.8}(HPO_{3})_{2.033}	cubic	I4̅3d	a=21.261, Z=48				
	NH_{4}Fe^{III}[BP_{2}O_{8}(OH)]	monoclinic	P2_{1}/c	a=9.393, b=8.285, c=9.689, β=102.07°, Z=4	737.4			
	(NH_{4})_{0.75}Fe(H_{2}O)_{2}[BP_{2}O_{8}]·1/4H_{2}O		P6_{5}22					
	(C_{3}H_{12}N_{2})[FeB_{2}P_{3}O_{12}(OH)]		Ima2					
	(C_{4}H_{12}N_{2})[FeB_{2}P_{3}O_{12}(OH)]		Ima2					
	(dienH_{3})(dienH_{2})_{0.5}[Fe^{II*III}_{2}B_{4}P_{7}O_{26}(OH)_{4}]		P1̅					
	NaFe[BP_{2}O_{7}(OH)_{3}]						triple	
sodium diaquoiron(II) catena-[monoboro-diphosphate] monohydrate	NaFe(H_{2}O)_{2}[BP_{2}O_{8}]•H_{2}O	hexagonal	P6_{1}22	a=9.499, c=15.931			loop branched chain	
	Na_{2}[FeB_{3}P_{2}O_{11}(OH)]·2/3H_{2}O	hexagonal	P6_{3}	a=11.812, c=12.067, Z=6		2.742	light yellow	
potassium diaquoiron(II) catena-[monoboro-diphosphate] hemihydrate	KFe(H_{2}O)_{2}[BP_{2}O_{8}]•H_{2}O	hexagonal	P6_{1}22	a=9.510, c=15.952			loop branched chain	
	K_{2}Fe_{2}[B_{2}P_{4}O_{16}(OH)_{2}]	monoclinic	P2_{1}/c	a=9.372, b=8.146, c=9.587, β=101.18°, Z=2	718.0		B_{2}P_{2}O_{4} ring with phosphate sides	
	KFeBP_{2}O_{8}(OH)		P2_{1}/c					
	CaFe[BP_{2}O_{7}(OH)_{3}]		C2/c					
	Ca_{0.5}Fe(H_{2}O)_{2}[BP_{2}O_{8}]·H_{2}O		P6_{5}22					
	Co_{5}[BP_{3}O_{14}]						double + phosphate	
	Co_{3}[BPO_{7}]	monoclinic	Cm	a=9.774, b=12.688, c=4.9057, β=119.749°, Z=4	528.2			
	Co[BPO_{4}(OH)_{2}]		P3_{1}21	a=7.4554, c=12.7397, Z=6	613.24	3.229		
	(NH_{4})_{7}Co_{4}(H_{2}O)[B_{2}P_{4}O_{15}(OH)_{2}]_{2}[H_{2}PO_{4}][HPO_{4}]		Pnma					
	(NH_{4})_{8}[Co_{2}B_{4}P_{8}O_{30}(OH)_{4}]		P1					
	(NH_{4})Co(H_{2}O)_{2}(BP_{2}O_{8})·H_{2}O		P6_{1}22	a = 9.501 c = 15.582	1218.2			
	Co^{II}(H_{2}O)_{2}[B_{2}P_{2}O_{8}(OH)_{2}]·H_{2}O		P2_{1}/c					
	[Co(en)_{3}][B_{2}P_{3}O_{11}(OH)_{2}]							
	CoB_{2}P_{3}O_{12}(OH)·H_{2}en							
	Co(C_{4}H_{12}N_{2})[B_{2}P_{3}O_{12}(OH)]	orthorhombic	Ima2	a=12.4635, b=9.4021, c=11.4513, Z=4	1341.90			
	H_{2}Co_{5}(H_{2}O)_{6}[BP_{2}O_{8}]_{4}•4H_{2}O	hexagonal	P6_{1}22	a=9.639, c=15.931, Z=1.5			purple	
	LiCo(H_{2}O)_{2}[BP_{2}O_{8}]·H_{2}O		P6_{5}22					
	NaCo(H_{2}O)_{2}[BP_{2}O_{8}]•H_{2}O	hexagonal	P6_{1}22	a=9.455, c=15.847			loop branched chain	
	NaCoH_{2}BP_{2}O_{9}	monoclinic	P2_{1}/c	a=6.547, b=11.404, c=9.650, β=107.37	687.6	2.905	pink; discovered in Tunisia	
	Na_{2}[CoB_{3}P_{2}O_{11}(OH)]·2/3H_{2}O	hexagonal	P6_{3}	a=11.759, c=12.099, Z=6		2.781	purple	
	Na_{5}(H_{3}O){Co_{3}[B_{3}O_{3}(OH)]_{3}(PO_{4})_{6}}·2H_{2}O	hexagonal	P6_{3}/m	a=11.7691, c=12.112, Z=2				
	Na_{6}Co_{3}B_{2}P_{5}O_{21}Cl·H_{2}O		Pnma					
	KCo(H_{2}O)_{2}[BP_{2}O_{8}]•H_{2}O	hexagonal	P6_{1}22	a=9.483, c=15.827			loop branched chain	
	CaCo(H_{2}O)[BP_{2}O_{8}(OH)]·H_{2}O		P1̅					
	(K_{0.17}Ca_{0.42})Co(H_{2}O)_{2}[BP_{2}O_{8}]·H_{2}O		P6_{5}22					
	(Co_{0.6}Mn_{0.4})_{2}(H_{2}O)[BP_{3}O_{9}(OH)_{4}]		P2_{1}2_{1}2_{1}					
cobalt borophosphate ethylenediamine	CoB_{2}P_{3}O_{12}(OH)·en	orthorhombic	Pbca	a=9.3501, b=12.2426, c=20.880	2,390.1	2.471	purple; layered	
	(NH_{4})_{7}Co_{4}(H_{2}O)[B_{2}P_{4}O_{15}(OH)_{2}]_{2}[H_{2}PO_{4}][HPO_{4}]	Orthorhombic	Pnma	a=16.9206, b=10.5592, c=22.000, Z=4	3,930.6	2.386	pink	
	(NH_{4})_{2}(C_{4}H_{12}N_{2})[Co_{2}B_{4}P_{6}O_{24}(OH)_{2}]·H_{2}O		I4_{1}/a					
	NiBPO_{4}(OH)_{2}		P3_{1}21					
	Ni(H_{2}O)_{2}[B_{2}P_{2}O_{8}(OH)_{2}]·H_{2}O		P2_{1}/c					
	LiNi(H_{2}O)_{2}[BP_{2}O_{8}]·H_{2}O		P6_{5}22					
	NaNi(H_{2}O)_{2}[BP_{2}O_{8}]•H_{2}O	hexagonal	P6_{1}22	a=9.371, c=15.831			loop branched chain	
	Na_{2}[NiB_{3}P_{2}O_{11}(OH)]·2/3H_{2}O	hexagonal	P6_{3}	a=11.728, c=12.074, Z=6		2.799	yellow	
	Na_{5}(H_{3}O){Ni_{3}[B_{3}O_{3}(OH)]_{3}(PO_{4})_{6}}·2H_{2}O	hexagonal	P6_{3}/m	a=11.7171, c=12.0759, Z=2				
	KNi(H_{2}O)_{2}[BP_{2}O_{8}]•H_{2}O	hexagonal	P6_{1}22	a=9.392, c=15.842			loop branched chain	
	Cu_{3}[B_{2}P_{3}O_{12}(OH)_{3}]	monoclinic	Cc	a=6.1895, b=13.6209, c=11.9373, β=97.62°, Z=4	997.5			
	Cu(H_{2}O)_{2}[B_{2}P_{2}O_{8}(OH)_{2}]							
	Cu_{2}(H_{2}O)[BP_{2}O_{8}(OH)]		Pbca					
	LiCu_{2}[BP_{2}O_{8}(OH)_{2}]		C2/c					
	LiCu_{2}[BP_{2}O_{8}(OH)_{2}]		P2_{1}2_{1}2_{1}					
	Na_{2}[CuB_{3}P_{2}O_{11}(OH)]·2/3H_{2}O	hexagonal	P6_{3}	a=11.554, c=12.314, Z=6		2.862	sky-blue	
	Na_{4}Cu_{3}[B_{2}P_{4}O_{15}(OH)_{2}]•2HPO_{4}						ring with side phosphate and extra phosphate	
	Na_{5}KCu_{3}[B_{9}P_{6}O_{33}(OH)_{3}]·H_{2}O		P6_{3}/m					
	Zn(C_{4}H_{12}N_{2})[B_{2}P_{3}O_{12}(OH)]	orthorhombic	Ima2	a=12.4110, b=9.4550, c=11.4592, Z=4	1344.69			
lithium zinc diaqua catena-[monoboro-diphosphate]-monohydrate	LiZn(H_{2}O)_{2}[BP_{2}O_{8}] · H_{2}O	hexagonal	P6_{1}	a=9.469, c=15.667, Z=6	1216.6		spiral ribbons	
	Na[ZnBP_{2}O_{8}]⋅H_{2}O	hexagonal	P6_{1}22	a=9.5404, c=14.7780, Z=6	1164.88			
	NaZn(H_{2}O)_{2}[BP_{2}O_{8}]•H_{2}O	hexagonal	P6_{1}22	a=9.456, c=15.828			loop branched chain	
	Na_{2}[ZnB_{3}P_{2}O_{11}(OH)]·2/3H_{2}O	hexagonal	P6_{3}	a=11.963, c=12.363, Z=6		2.683	colourless	
	NH_{4}[ZnBP_{2}O_{8}]	triclinic	P1̅	a=7.437, b=7.612, c=7.850, α=119.05, β=101.59, γ=103.43, Z=2	351.18	2.687		
	Na[ZnBP_{2}O_{8}]	triclinic	P1̅					
	K[ZnBP_{2}O_{8}]	monoclinic	C2/c	a=12.617, b=12.773, c=8.415, β=91.25°, Z=8	1355.8	2.991		
	[trienH_{4}]_{1.5}[Zn_{6}B_{6}P_{12}O_{48}]·3/2H_{2}O	hexagonal	P6_{5}22	a=9.6685, c=14.8879; Z=1				
RBPO	Rb_{3}B_{11}P_{2}O_{23}	Triclinic	P1	a=7.785, b=7.839, c=7.963, α=89,774, β=89.129, γ=88.211, Z=2	485.6	2.753	transparent above 168 nm; SHG 2.5× KDP; birefringence =0.071@1064 nm	
	Rb[P_{2}B_{2}O_{8}(OH)]						network	
	Li_{3}Rb_{2}BP_{4}O_{14}		Cmca					
	Rb_{3}B_{11}PO_{19}F_{3}	trigonal	R3	a=11.3715 c=12.0240 Z=3	1346.53	2.839	colourless; decompose > 470 °C; SHG 1.3 × KDP	
	K_{2}RbB_{4}PO_{10}	triclinic	P1̅	a=6.5577, b=6.5931, c=13.098, α=84.626, β=80.514, γ=60.457, Z=2	485.9	2.719	colourless	
	K_{2}RbB_{8}PO_{16}						birefringence 0.057@1064 nm	
	K_{0.9}Rb_{2.1}B_{8}PO_{16}	monoclinic	Cc	a=11.3446 b=6.5485 c=19.354 β=101.315°	1409.9	2.761	birefringence 0.075@532 nm; band gap 6.16 eV;SHG 0.7 × KDP	
	Rb_{2}Co_{3}(H_{2}O)_{2}[B_{4}P_{6}O_{24}(OH)_{2}]	orthorhombic	Pbca	a = 9.501, b = 12.272, c = 20.074, Z = 4				
	Rb[ZnBP_{2}O_{8}]	triclinic	P1̅	a=7.439, b=7.639, c=7.861, α=118.82, β=101.73, γ=103.51, Z=2	353.4	3.304		
	Sr[BPO_{5}]		P3_{2}21				loop branch B_{2}PO_{3} rings	
	KSrBP_{2}O_{8}		I4̅2d	a=7.109, c=13.882				
	SrFe[BP_{2}O_{8}(OH)_{2}]		C2/c					
	SrCo_{2}BPO_{7}	monoclinic	P2_{1}/c	a=6.485, b=9.270, c=10.066, β=111.14, Z=4	548.7		red	
	AgMg(H_{2}O)_{2}[BP_{2}O_{8}]·H_{2}O		P6_{5}22					
	2/3H_{2}O		P6_{5}22					
	(Ag_{0.57}Ni_{0.22})Ni(H_{2}O)_{2}[BP_{2}O_{8}]·2/3H_{2}O		P6_{5}22					
	Na_{3}Cd_{3}BP_{4}O_{16}	orthorhombic	Pmc2_{1}	a=13.6854, b=5.335, c=18.2169, Z=4			SHG 1.1×KDP	
	NH_{4}Cd(H_{2}O)_{2}(BP_{2}O_{8})·0.72H_{2}O	hexagonal	P6_{5}	a=9.698, c=16.026, Z=6	1305.3	2.886	colourless	
	In_{2}[B(PO_{4})_{3}]		P6_{3}/m					
	Cs[P_{2}B_{2}O_{8}(OH)]						3D network	
	Li_{2}Cs_{2}B_{2}P_{4}O_{15}							
	K_{2}CsB_{4}PO_{10}	triclinic	P1̅	a=6.6235, b=6.6243, c=13.273, α=79.734, β=86.558, γ=60.095, Z=2	496.46	2.979	colourless	
	Cs_{2}Cr_{3}(BP_{4}O_{14})(P_{4}O_{13})	monoclinic	P2_{1}/c	a=14.7918, b=15.819, c=9.7037, β=92.450, Z=4	876.9	3.257	green; [B(P_{2}O_{7})_{2}]^{5−}	
	CsFe(BP_{3}O_{11})	orthorhombic	Pnma	a=8.5375, b=12.7829, c=8.3346, Z=4	909.59	3.434	[N(PO_{4})(P_{2}O_{7})]^{4-}	
	Cs_{2}Co_{3}(H_{2}O)_{2}[B_{4}P_{6}O_{24}(OH)_{2}]	orthorhombic	Pbca	a=9.5526, b=12.3190, c=20.1123	2366.8		pink	
	Cs[ZnBP_{2}O_{8}]	triclinic	P1̅	a=7.506, b=7.914, c=8.038, α=1198.05, β=102.96, γ=104.50, Z=2	373.9	3.545		
	Ba[BPO_{5}]		P3_{2}21					
	Ba[BP_{3}O_{12}]	orthorhombic	Ibca	a=7.066, b=14.268, c=22.159	2233.9	4.209		
	BaB_{2}P_{2}O_{8}F_{2}	monoclinic	P2_{1}/n	a=4.4719 b=20.499 c=7.8896 β=92.955° Z=4	722.3	3.558	birefringence 0.007 @ 532 nm	
	KBaBP_{2}O_{8}		I4̅2d	a=7.202, c=14.300				
	BaFe[BP_{2}O_{8}(OH)]		P1̅					
	BaCo[BP_{2}O_{8}(OH)]		P1̅					
	Pb[BPO_{5}]						loop branch B_{2}PO_{3} rings	
	Pb_{3}[(PO_{4})_{2}BPO_{4}]	orthorhombic	Pbca	a=6.946, b=14.199, c=21.116, Z=8	2082.5	5.851	open branch, 2 PO_{4} extra on each B	
	Na_{3}Pb^{II}[B(O_{3}POH)_{4}]		I4_{1}/a					
	KPbBP_{2}O_{8}		I4̅2d					
	Pb^{II}_{4}Cl{Co_{2}[B(OH)_{2}P_{2}O_{8}](PO_{4})_{2}]}		R3̅c					
	RbPbBP_{2}O_{8}		I4̅2d					
	BiCo_{2}BP_{2}O_{10}		P2_{1}/m					
	BiNi_{2}BP_{2}O_{10}		P2_{1}/m					
	K_{2}(UO_{2})_{12}[B(H_{2}PO_{4})_{4}](PO_{4})_{8}(OH)(H_{2}O)_{6}	tetragonal	I4̅2m	a=21.8747, c=7.0652	3380.7			
	K_{5}(UO_{2})_{2}[B_{2}P_{3}O_{12}(OH)]_{2}(OH)(H_{2}O)_{2}	monoclinic	P2_{1}	a=6.7623, b=19.5584, c=11.0110, β=95.579°	1449.42			
	Ag_{2}(NH_{4})_{3}{(UO_{2})_{2}[B_{3}O(PO_{4})_{4}(HPO_{4})_{2}]}·H_{2}O		P1̅					
	Ag_{2−x}(NH_{4})_{3}{(UO_{2})_{2}[B_{2}P_{5−y}As_{y}O_{20−x}(OH)_{x}]}		Pcmn					
	Cs_{3}(UO_{2})_{3}[B(PO_{4})_{4}]∙(H_{2}O)_{0.5}		P4_{1}2_{1}2	a=12.2376, c=33.9468, Z=4	5083.8		yellow; microporous	
