= Boroantimonate =

Boroantimonates are chemical compounds in which borate and antimonate groups share oxygen atoms. Known compounds are transparent. Antimony is in the +5 oxidation state and is in octahedral coordination by oxygen.

== List ==
name	formula	mw	crystal system	space group	unit cell Å	volume	density	comment	references
	SbB_{3}O_{6}	414.11	monoclinic	C2	a=7.143 b=4.953 c=6.393 β=105.70 Z=2	217.71	3.816	band gap 4.083 eV; birefringence Δn=0.290 at 546 nm; NLO 3.5 × KH_{2}PO_{4}	
	Na_{2}SbB_{3}O_{8}	328.16	monoclinic	P2_{1}/c	a=5.8278 b=10.3521 c=10.4775 β=102.948° Z=4	616.04	3.538	colourless	
	KSbB_{2}O_{6}		monoclinic	Cc	a=11.458 b=7.019 c=7.324 β=124.413°				
	K_{2}SbB_{3}O_{8}	360.38	monoclinic	P2_{1}/c	a=5.9013 b=11.088 c=10.950 β=103.218° Z=4	697.5	3.432	colourless	
	α-K_{3}Sb_{4}BO_{13}	823.11	monoclinic	C2/m	a=12.2032 b=7.4881 c=13.070 β=101.636° Z=4	1169.8	4.674	200K	
	β-K_{3}Sb_{4}BO_{13}	823.11	triclinic	P1̅	a=7.1168 b=7.211 c=13.2218 α=81.923 β=99.760 γ=117.10 Z=2	593.79	4.602	250K	
	β-RbSbB_{2}O_{6}	324.84	monoclinic	Cc	a=11.715 b=7.1633 c=7.4109 β=125.43°	506.71	4.258	colourless	
	Rb_{2}SbB_{3}O_{8}	453.12	monoclinic	P2_{1}/c	a=5.9381 b=11.2928 c=11.318 β=103.7° Z=4	737.2	4.083	colourless	
	KRb_{2}Sb_{4}BO_{13}	916.31	triclinic	P1̅	a=7.1456 b=7.2390 c=13.4113 α=82.058 β=100.051 γ=117.205 Z=2	606.16	5.020	colourless	
	Rb_{3}Sb_{4}BO_{13}	962.22	triclinic	P1̅	a=7.1593 b=7.2533 c=13.4894 α=82.358° β=99.999° γ=117.321° Z=2	611.75	5.224	colourless	
	BaSb_{2}B_{4}O_{12}		monoclinic	C2/c	a=6.9818 b=11.8452 c=11.089 β=102.772°				
	SmBSb_{2}O_{8}		orthorhombic	Pnma	a=12.6155 b=7.2702 c=12.7086				
	EuBSb_{2}O_{8}		orthorhombic	Pnma	a=12.5730 b=7.2605 c=12.6920				
	GdBSb_{2}O_{8}		orthorhombic	Pnma	a=12.5594 b=7.2369 c=12.6913				
	TbBSb_{2}O_{8}		orthorhombic	Pnma	a=12.532 b=7.236 c=12.671				
