= Mixed-anion compounds =

Class of chemical compounds

Mixed-anion compounds, heteroanionic materials or mixed-anion materials are chemical compounds containing cations and more than one kind of anion. The compounds contain a single phase, rather than just a mixture.

== Use in materials science ==
By having more than one anion, many more compounds can be made, and properties tuned to desirable values. In terms of optics, properties include phosphorescence, photocatalysis, laser damage threshold, refractive index, birefringence, absorption particularly in the ultraviolet or near infrared, non-linearity. Mechanical properties can include ability to grow a large crystal, ability to form a thin layer, strength, or brittleness.

Thermal properties can include melting point, thermal stability, phase transition temperatures, thermal expansion coefficient.

For electrical properties, electric conductivity, band gap, superconducting transition temperature piezoelectricity, pyroelectricity, ferromagnetism, dielectric constant, charge-density wave transition can be adjusted.

== Production ==
Many of the non-metals that could make mixed-anion compounds may have greatly varying volatilities. This makes it more difficult to combine the elements together. Compounds may be produced in a solid state reaction, by heating solids together, either in a vacuum or a gas. Common gases used include, oxygen, hydrogen, ammonia, chlorine, fluorine, hydrogen sulfide, or carbon disulfide. Soft chemical approaches to manufacture include solvothermal synthesis, or substituting atoms in a structure by others, including by water, oxygen, fluorine, or nitrogen. Teflon pouches can be used to separate different formulations. Thin film deposits can yield strained layers. High pressures can be used to prevent evaporation of volatiles. High pressure can result in different crystal forms, perhaps with higher coordination number.

== Kinds ==
=== Elemental ===
- pnictochalcogenides
  - oxypnictides, including oxynitrides, oxyphosphides, oxyarsenides, oxyantimonides, oxybismuthides
- chalcohalides or chalcogenide halides
  - oxohalides, including oxyfluorides, oxychlorides, oxybromides, oxyiodides
  - fluorosulfides
  - sulfide chlorides, selenide chlorides, telluride chlorides
  - sulfide bromides, selenide bromides, telluride bromides
  - sulfide iodides, selenide iodides, telluride iodides
- oxysulfides, oxyselenides
- oxyhydrides
- halopnictides
  - fluoropnictides, including fluorophosphides, fluoroarsenides, fluoroantimonides, fluorobismuthides, arsenide chlorides

	H																
B	BH	B															
C	CH	CB	C														
N	NH	NB	NC	N													
O	OH	OB	OC	ON	O												
F	FH	FB	FC	FN	FO	F											
Si	SiH	SiB	SiC	SiN	SiO	SiF	Si										
P	PH	PB	PC	PN	PO	PF	PSi	P									
S	SH	SB	SC	SN	SO	SF	SSi	SP	S								
Cl	ClH	ClB	ClC	ClN	ClO	ClF	ClSi	ClP	ClS	Cl							
Ge	GeH	GeB	GeC	GeN	GeO	GeF	GeSi	GeP	GeS	GeCl	Ge						
As	AsH	AsB	AsC	AsN	AsO	AsF	AsSi	AsP	AsS	AsCl	AsGe	As					
Se	SeH	SeB	SeC	SeN	SeO	SeF	SeSi	SeP	SeS	SeCl	SeGe	SeAs	Se				
Br	BrH	BrB	BrC	BrN	BrO	BrF	BrSi	BrP	BrS	BrCl	BrGe	BrAs	BrSe	Br			
Sb	SbH	SbB	SbC	SbN	SbO	SbF	SbSi	SbP	SbS	SbCl	SbGe	SbAs	SbSe	SbBr	Sb		
Te	TeH	TeB	TeC	TeN	TeO	TeF	TeSi	TeP	TeS	TeCl	TeGe	TeAs	TeSe	TeBr	TeSb	Te	
I	IH	IB	IC	IN	IO	IF	ISi	IP	IS	ICl	IGe	IAs	ISe	IBr	ISb	ITe	I
Bi	BiH	BiB	BiC	BiN	BiO	BiF	BiSi	BiP	BiS	BiCl	BiGe	BiAs	BiSe	BiBr	BiSb	BiTe	BiI

=== Molecular anions ===
- borohydride-chloride
- disulfide dithioorthovanadate

=== Oxyanions ===
- halocarbonates, including carbonate fluorides, carbonate chlorides, carbonate bromides
- phosphates, including fluoride phosphates, chloride phosphate, phosphate molybdates, phosphate arsenates
- borates
  - halide borates, including fluoride borates borate chlorides, borate bromides, borate iodides
  - chalcogenide borates, including sulfide borates
  - borate carbonates, borate nitrates, borate sulfates, borate phosphates
  - borate acetates
  - Condensed borates: borosulfates, boroselenates, borotellurates, boroantimonates, borophosphates, boroselenites
- sulfates
  - sulfate fluorides, sulfate chlorides
  - sulfate arsenate
- selenite fluorides
- iodate fluorides
- Silicates
  - sulfide silicates

=== Mixed valency and oligomers ===
Some elements can form several kinds of anions, and compounds may exist with more than one. Examples include the iodate periodates, sulfite sulfates, selenate selenites, tellurite tellurates, nitrate nitrites, phosphate phosphites, and arsenate arsenites.

These kinds also include different oligomeric forms such as phosphates or fluorotitanates, such as [Ti_{4}F_{20}]^{4-} and [TiF_{5}]^{−}.

=== Organic ===
- borate acetate
- oxalate formate
