= Nitride iodide =

Class of chemical compounds

An iodide nitride is a mixed anion compound containing both iodide (I^{−}) and nitride ions (N^{3−}). Another name is metalloiodonitrides. They are a subclass of halide nitrides or pnictide halides. Some different kinds include ionic alkali or alkaline earth salts, small clusters where metal atoms surround a nitrogen atom, layered group 4 element 2-dimensional structures (which could be exfoliated to a monolayer), and transition metal nitrido complexes counter-balanced with iodide ions. There is also a family with rare earth elements and nitrogen and sulfur in a cluster.

Related mixed-anion compounds include halogen variations: nitride fluoride, nitride chloride, and nitride bromide, and pnictogen variations phosphide iodide, arsenide iodide and antimonide iodides.

== Production ==
Nitride iodides may be produced by heating metal nitrides with metal iodides. The ammonolysis process heats a metal iodide with ammonia. A related method heats a metal or metal hydride with ammonium iodide. The nitrogen source could also be an azide or an amide.

== List ==
name	formula	formula weight	crystal system	space group	unit cell Å	volume	density	comments	ref
	Li_{4}NCl		hexagonal	R3	a=366.225 c=1977.18 Z=3				
calcium nitride iodide	Ca_{2}NI			P6_{3}/mmc	a = 3.8095, c = 14.530, Z = 2				
	α-TiNI		orthorhombic	Pmmn	a=3.941 b=3.51.5 c=8.955 Z=2			black	
	NCr(I)(N^{i}Pr_{2})_{2}								
	Cr(I)(N)(N(C(CD_{3})_{2}CH_{3)}(C_{6}H_{3}FMe))2								
	Zn_{2}NI		orthorhombic	Pnma	a=6.3590 b=6.2529 c=7.9549			<6 GPa	
strontium nitride iodide	Sr_{2}NI	316.15	trigonal	R3̅m	a = 4.0049 c = 23.055 Z=3	320.24	4.918	orange	
	α-ZrNI		orthorhombic	Pmmn	a=4.114 b=3.724 c=9.431 Z=2			orange	
	β-ZrNI		trigonal	R3̅m	a=3.718 c=31.381 Z=6			brown	
	[(pcp)Mo^{(IV)}(N)(I)][Na(15-crown-5)] pcp=C_{6}H_{3}(OPiPr_{2})_{2}								
	Ba_{2}NI								
	LiLa_{4}N_{2}I_{7}		orthorhombic	Pnma	a = 13.7417, b = 12.1345, c = 10.7991 Z=4			@100K	
	NaLa_{4}N_{2}I_{7}		orthorhombic	Pna2_{1}	a=14.0018 b=10.9315 c=12.1021 Z=4		5.361	colourless air sensitive	
	Ce_{15}N_{7}I_{24}	4245.6	orthorhombic	Pnma	a=12.060 b=32.216 c=16.360 Z=4		5.48	red; air sensitive	
	NaCe_{4}N_{2}I_{7}		orthorhombic	Pna2_{1}	a=13.9703 b=10.8932 c=12.0194 Z=4		5.446	red air sensitive	
	NaPr_{4}N_{2}I_{7}		orthorhombic	Pna2_{1}	a=13.9412 b=10.8578 c=11.9389 Z=4		5.524	yellowish green air sensitive	
	NaNd_{4}N_{2}I_{7}		orthorhombic	Pna2_{1}	a=13.9135 b=10.86 c=11.86 Z=4		5.638	pinkish blue air sensitive	
	(NdI_{2})_{3}N								
	(NdI_{2})_{3}N(DME)_{4}								
	NdI(S_{2}N_{2})(THF)								
	Nd_{3}I_{5}(S_{2}N_{2})(S_{2})(THF)_{10}	2088.72	monoclinic	P2_{1}	a=12.393 b=43.389 c=12.684 β=90.013 Z=4	6820	2.034	yellow	
	Ln_{3}I_{5}(S_{2})(S_{2}N_{2})(THF)_{4}(Phen)_{3}								
	Ln_{3}I_{5}(S_{2})(S_{2}N_{2})(THF)3(Py)_{7}								
	(SmI)_{3}N_{2}(THF)								
	ErI(S_{2}N_{2})(THF)								
	Nd_{2}ErClI_{4}-(S_{2})(S_{2}N_{2})(THF)_{7}								
	Nd_{2}ErCl_{2}I_{3}(S_{2})(S_{2}N_{2})(THF)_{7}								
	(DyI_{2})_{3}N								
	Dy_{3}I_{5}(S_{2})(S_{2}N_{2})(THF)_{10}								
	Nd_{2}DyI_{5}(S_{2})(S_{2}N_{2})(THF)_{7}								
	Nd_{2}DyI_{5}(S_{3})(S_{2}N_{2})(THF)_{9}	2034.88	monoclinic	P2_{1}/c	a=23.1102 b=12.6551 c=23.8268 β =111.201 Z=4	6496.8	2.080		
	Nd_{2}TbI_{5}(S_{2})(S_{2}N_{2})(THF)_{9}		monoclinic	P2_{1}/c	a =23.1704 b =12.6340 c =23.8340, β =111.274° Z=4				
	Nd_{2}TmI_{5}(S_{2})(S_{2}N_{2})(THF)_{9}		monoclinic	P2_{1}/c	a =23.075 b =12.6540 c =23.809, β =111.460° Z=4				
	Nd_{2}YbI_{5}(S_{3})(S_{2}N_{2})(THF)_{9}		monoclinic	P2_{1}/c	a=23.0959 b=12.6632 c=23.8387 β =111.363 Z=4	6493.0	2.092		
	α-HfNI		orthorhombic	Pmmn	a=4.10.67 b=3.6944 c=9.382 Z=2				
	β-HfNI		trigonal	R3̅m	a=3.689 c=31.329 Z=6			brown	
	ThNI		tetragonal	P4/nmm	a=4.107 c=9.242			orange to golden grey	
	UNI		tetragonal	P4/nmm	a=3.99 c=9.20 Z=2				
