= Hydride telluride =

Hydride tellurides are mixed anion compounds containing both hydride and telluride ions. They are in the category of heteroanionic chalcogenides, or mixed anion compounds. Related compounds include the oxyhydrides, hydride sulfides, and hydride selenides.

== Formation ==
Salt-like hydride tellurides may be formed by heating tellurium with a metal hydride in an oxygen-free capsule at around 700°C with a caesium chloride flux to assist in crystal formation. For rare earth elements, this method works as long as tellurium has enough oxidising power to convert a +2 oxidation state to a +3 state. So for samarium, europium, thulium and ytterbium it does not work as the monotelluride is more stable with the metal in a +2 oxidation state. Also scandium and lutetium atoms are too small.

LaH_{3} + Te → LaHTe + H_{2}

Tellurido-hydrido-transition metal complexes are known. They are formed by heating metal hydrido complexes with tellurium.

L_{2}MH_{3} + 2 Te → L_{2}M(Te_{2})H + H_{2}
L_{2}MH_{3} + Te → L_{2}M(=Te)H + H_{2}

where L and M represent ...

== Properties ==
With rare earth elements the hydride tellurides all have the same structure as the small or heavy rare-earth elements. Six selenium ions are arranged in a trigonal prism around the rare-earth atom. The rectangular faces are capped with hydride ions. Bond lengths are about the same as for binary tellurides and hydrides.

When heated to 1100°C, rare-earth hydride tellurides decompose to a monotelluride:

2LaHTe → 2LaTe + H_{2}

== List ==
Some hydride tellurides, with details of crystal structure
Formula	Crystal system	Space group	Unit cell (in angstroms)	Volume	Density	Notes	Ref.
[η^{1}-3,5-tBu_{2}pz(η-Al)H)_{2}Te]•CH_{3}C_{6}H_{5} pz=pyrazolato	monoclinic	P2_{1}/n	a=12.288 b=15.592 c= 18.031 β=106.29° Z=4	3316.1	1.270	melt 250°C; colourless	
YHTe	hexagonal	P6̅m2	a=4.0095 c=4.1547 Z=1			pale grey; water insensitive	
(t-BuC_{5}H_{4})_{2}Nb(η^{2}-Te_{2})H						dark orange	
[(C_{5}Me_{5})_{2}Nb(Te_{2})H] ??							
(tBuC_{5}H_{4})_{2}Nb(Te_{2})H·Cr(CO)_{5}							
{(tBuC_{5}H_{4})_{2}NbH(Te)_{2}}Fe_{2}(CO)_{6}							
{(tBuC_{5}H_{4})_{2}NbH(Te)_{2}Fe_{2}(CO)_{6}}·Cr(CO)_{5}							
Mo(PMe_{3})_{4}(η^{2}-Te_{2})H_{2}	monoclinic	P2_{1}/n	a=9.623 b=15.297 c=16.504 β=98.31° Z=4	2400		black	
LaHTe	hexagonal	P6̅m2	a=4.220 c=4.3914 Z=1			pale grey	
CeHTe	hexagonal	P6̅m2	a=4.1756 c=4.3403 Z=1		6.81	pale grey	
PrHTe	hexagonal	P6̅m2	a=4.1461 c=4.3130 Z=1			pale grey	
NdHTe	hexagonal	P6̅m2	a=4.1162 c=4.2897 Z=1			pale grey	
GdHTe	hexagonal	P6̅m2	a=4.0413 c=4.2048 Z=1			pale grey	
TbHTe	hexagonal	P6̅m2	a=4.0233 c=4.1639 Z=1			pale grey	
DyHTe	hexagonal	P6̅m2	a=3.9984 c=4.1598 Z=1			pale grey	
HoHTe	hexagonal	P6̅m2	a=3.9813 c=4.1489 Z=1			pale grey	
ErHTe	hexagonal	P6̅m2	a=3.9659 c=4.1072 Z=1		8.78	pale grey	
Cp*_{2}Ta(Te_{2})H Cp*2Ta=permethyltantalocene						yellow	
Cp*_{2}Ta(Te)H							
W(PMe_{3})_{4}(η^{2}-Te_{2})H_{2}							
