= Selenide borate =

Selenide borates, officially known as borate selenides, are chemical mixed anion compounds that contain any kind of borate and selenide ions. They are distinct from selenoborates in which selenium atoms replace oxygen in borates. There are also analogous borate sulfides, with sulfur ions instead of selenium.

== List ==
name	chem	mw	crystal system	space group	unit cell	volume	density	comments	references
	Zn_{8}Se_{2}[BO_{2}]_{12}			I4̅3m	a=7.6749 b=7.6749 c=7.6749			band gap 4.42 eV SHG 0.14xKDP	
	YSeBO_{2}	210.68	orthorhombic	Cmc2_{1}	a=5.6617 b=16.5858 c=1.441 Z=4	389.15	3.596	band gap 3.45 eV	
	Sm_{6}Ta_{2}MgSeB_{8}O_{26}	1869.75	trigonal	P3̅	a=8.089 c=8.6765 Z=1	491.70	6.314		
	Eu_{6}Ta_{2}MgSeB_{8}O_{26}	1879.41	trigonal	P3̅	a=8.0717 c=8.6491 Z=1	488.01	6.395		
	Gd_{6}Ta_{2}MgSeB_{8}O_{26}	1911.15	trigonal	P3̅	a=8.0536 c=8.6296 Z=1	484.73	6.547		
