= Phosphide carbide =

Phosphide carbides or carbide phosphides are compounds containing anions composed of carbide (C^{4−}) and phosphide (P^{3−}). They can be considered as mixed anion compounds. Related compounds include phosphide silicides, germanide phosphides, arsenide carbides, nitride carbides and silicide carbides.

In light rare earth phosphide carbides, the ethenide ion [C=C]^{4−} exists. In these P and C_{2} are disordered, and they randomly substitute for each other, even though charge differs. Bonds between carbon and phosphorus are weak, and so these kinds of compounds do not contain a C-P bond, instead carbon or phosphorus stand by themselves.

Phosphide carbides can be made by heating a metal, red phosphorus and graphite powder together in a carbon crucible under an inert gas atmosphere.

== List ==
formula	system	space group	unit cell Å	volume	density	comment	ref
V_{2}PC	hexagonal	P6_{3}/mmc	a=3.077 c=10.91				
V_{3}PC_{1-x}							
V_{4}P_{2}C		P6̅2m	a =9.567,c =3.166				
V_{18}P_{9}C_{2}	orthorhombic	Pmma	a = 17.044, b = 3.2219, c = 13.030, Z = 2	715.5	5.66		
Cr_{3}PC	orthorhombic	Cmcm	a=3.051 b=9.702 c=7.295 Z=4	216	6.16	metallic	
Cr_{8.105}P_{6}C_{0.76}Cr_{8}P_{6}C		P3_{1}m	a=6.682 c=4.606				
Nb_{2}PC	hexagonal	P6_{3}/mmc	a=3.38 c=11.5			black	
Nb_{3}P_{2}C	hexagonal	P6_{3}/mmc	a=3.3063 c=18.0808 Z=2	171.149	6.8		
YRu_{2}PC		Cmcm	Z=4			grey; air stable	
La_{4}[P_{0.64}(C_{2})_{0.36}]_{3}	cubic	I2_{1}3	a=8.9300 Z=4	712.1			
Ce_{4}[P_{0.66}(C_{2})_{0.34}]_{3}	cubic	I2_{1}3	a=8.7592 Z=4	680.4			
Pr_{4}[P_{0.65}(C_{2})_{0.35}]_{3}	cubic	I2_{1}3	a=8.809 Z=4	683.6			
Nd_{4}[P_{0.68}(C_{2})0.32]_{3}	cubic	I2_{1}3	a=8.6763 Z=4	653.1			
CeRu_{2}PC		Cmcm	a=3.8896 b=10.9730 c=7.1472 Z=4	305.0	5.05	grey; air stable	
SmRu_{2}PC		Cmcm	3.8278 b=10.9465 c=7.0986 Z=4	297.4	5.32	grey; air stable	
GdRu_{2}PC		Cmcm	Z=4			grey; air stable	
TbRu_{2}PC		Cmcm	a=3.7764 b=10.9661 c=7.0504 Z=4	292.0	5.53	grey; air stable	
DyRu_{2}PC		Cmcm	Z=4			grey; air stable	
HoRu_{2}PC		Cmcm	Z=4			grey; air stable	
ErRu_{2}PC		Cmcm	Z=4			grey; air stable	
Ta_{3}P_{2}C	hexagonal	P6_{3}/mmc	a=3.2969 c=18.010 Z=2	169.531	12.1		
YOs_{2}PC		Cmcm	Z=4			grey; air stable	
CeOs_{2}PC		Cmcm	Z=4			grey; air stable	
PrOs_{2}PC		Cmcm	Z=4			grey; air stable	
NdOs_{2}PC		Cmcm	Z=4			grey; air stable	
SmOs_{2}PC		Cmcm	Z=4			grey; air stable	
GdOs_{2}PC		Cmcm	a=3.8274 b=10.8875 c=7.2140 Z=4	300.6	7.73	grey; air stable	
TbOs_{2}PC		Cmcm	Z=4			grey; air stable	
