= Hydride selenide =

Class of chemical compounds

Hydride selenides are mixed anion compounds containing both hydride and selenide ions. They are in the category of heteroanionic chalcogenides, or mixed anion compounds. Related compounds include the oxyhydrides, hydride sulfides, and hydride tellurides.

== Formation ==
Salt-like hydride selenides may be formed by heating selenium with a metal hydride in an oxygen-free capsule. For rare earth elements, this method works as long as selenium has enough oxidising power to convert a +2 oxidation state to a +3 state. So for europium and ytterbium it does not work as the monoselenide is more stable.

One transition metal complex was formed from a lithium zirconium hydride complex in solution reacting with diphenylphosphine selenide.

== Properties ==
With rare earth elements there are two structure depending on the size of the metal ions. The large atoms form a 2H hexagonal anti-nickel arsenide structure, with hydrogen inserted into tetrahedral positions. A 1H hexagonal structure is found in rare earth elements from gadolinium to lutetium, and yttrium.

== List ==
formula	system	space group	unit cell Å	volume	density	comment	reference
[η^{1}-3,5-tBu_{2}pz(η-Al)H)_{2}Se] pz=pyrazolato	monoclinic	P2_{1}/n	a=14.385 b=11.035 c=16.522 β=98.90° Z=6	2591.1	1.265	melt 272°C; colourless	
Sc_{2}H_{2}Se	trigonal	P3̅m1	a=3.5664 c=6.1166				
YHSe	hexagonal	P6̅_{3}/m2	a=3.8333 c=3.8876 Z=1		5.64	black; water insensitive; insulator	
Y_{2}H_{2}Se	trigonal	P3̅m1					
[(C_{5}Me_{5})_{2}ZrH]_{2}(μ-Se)	orthorhombic	Ccc2	a=20.809 b=20.865 c=19.239 Z=8	8353	1.284	red / orange	
LaHSe	hexagonal	P6̅_{3}/mmc	a=4.1151 c=8.0036 Z=2			bluish grey	
La_{2}H_{2}Se	trigonal	P3̅m1	a=4.1268 c=6.8733				
La_{2}H_{3}Se	trigonal	P3̅m1	a=4.139 c=6.960				
La_{2}H_{4}Se	trigonal	R3̅m	a=4.0542 c=22.609				
CeHSe	hexagonal	P6̅_{3}/mmc	a = 4.0636 c = 7.9481 Z=2			bluish grey	
PrHSe	hexagonal	P6̅_{3}/mmc	a=4.0223 c=7.9183 Z=2			bluish grey	
NdHSe	hexagonal	P6̅_{3}/mmc	a=3.9874 c=7.8888 Z=2			bluish grey	
GdHSe	hexagonal	P6̅_{3}/m2	a=3.8802 c=3.9260 Z=1			bluish grey	
TbHSe	hexagonal	P6̅_{3}/m2	a=3.8517 c=3.9066 Z=1			bluish grey	
DyHSe	hexagonal	P6̅_{3}/m2	a=3.8348 c=3.8874 Z=1			bluish grey	
HoHSe	hexagonal	P6̅_{3}/m2	a = 3.8156 c = 3.8728 Z=1			bluish grey	
ErHSe	hexagonal	P6̅_{3}/m2	a=3.7874 c=3.8636 Z=1			bluish grey	
LuHSe	hexagonal	P6̅_{3}/m2	a=3.7474 c=3.8239 Z=1			bluish grey	
