= Arsenide telluride =

Arsenide tellurides or telluride arsenides are compounds containing anions composed of telluride (Te^{2−}) and arsenide (As^{3−}). They can be considered as mixed anion compounds. Related compounds include the arsenide sulfides, arsenide selenides, antimonide tellurides, and phosphide tellurides. Some are in the category of arsenopyrite-type compounds with As:Te of 1:1. Yet others are layered with As:Te of 1:2.

Arsenide telluride compounds can be made by heating the elements together.

== List ==
	formula	system	space group	unit cell Å	volume	density	comment	ref
	TiAsTe	orthorhombic	Immm	a = 3.5730 b = 5.249 c = 12.794			@153K; n-type metallic	
	FeAsTe							
	Fe_{5}AsTe_{2}	rhombohedral	R3̅m	a=4.065788 c=29.7408			cleavable layered	
	As_{2.8}Te_{5.12}Zr_{3.88}	orthorhombic	Immm	a=5.64 b=13.37 c=3.78	285	7.013	Zr and Te deficient	
zirconium arsenotelluride	Zr_{2.00}As_{2.86}Te_{0.92}			a = 3.82 c = 8.17		7.14		
ruthenium arsenide telluride	RuTeAs	monoclinic		a=6.36 b=6.30 c=6.40 β=113.6°			natural mineral	
osmium arsenide telluride	OsAsTe	monoclinic		a=6.37 b=6.31 c=6.42 β=113.1°				
	ThAsTe	tetragonal	P4/nmm	a=4.260 c=8.812 Z=2			metallic	
	UAsTe	tetragonal	P4/nmm	a=4.167 c=8.764			Curie temp 66K; metallic	
	NpAsTe	tetragonal	P4/nmm	a=4.140 c=8.909			Curie temp 25K	
	PuAsTe	tetragonal	P4/nmm		165		Curie temp 125K	
	AmAsTe	tetragonal	P4/nmm	a=4.238 c=9.087				
