= Ammonium hexafluororhenate =

Names
- Other names Ammonium hexafluororhenate(IV)

Identifiers
3D model (JSmol)	Interactive image
- InChI: InChI=1S/6FH.2H3N.Re/h6*1H;2*1H3;/q;;;;;;;;+4/p-4 Key: XJBVMCSHXBGWCE-UHFFFAOYSA-J
- SMILES: [NH4+].[NH4+].F[Re-2](F)(F)(F)(F)F

Properties
Chemical formula	F_{6}H_{8}N_{2}Re
Molar mass	336.275 g·mol^{−1}
Appearance	pale pink crystals
Density	3.680 g/cm^{3}
Solubility in water	soluble
- Except where otherwise noted, data are given for materials in their standard state (at 25 °C [77 °F], 100 kPa). Infobox references

Ammonium hexafluororhenate is an inorganic chemical compound with the chemical formula (NH_{4})_{2}ReF_{6}.

== Synthesis ==
The compound is produced from the corresponding potassium salt by ion-exchange procedure.

== Physical properties ==
Ammonium hexafluororhenate forms crystals of the hexagonal system, space group P3̅m1. It is soluble in water.

When heated, the compound decomposes to the black nitride fluoride, ReNF.
