= Silicide carbide =

Class of chemical compounds

Silicide carbides or carbide silicides are compounds containing anions composed of silicide (Si^{4−}) and carbide (C^{4−}) or clusters therof. They can be considered as mixed anion compounds or intermetallic compounds, as silicon could be considered as a semimetal.

Related compounds include the germanide carbides, phosphide silicides, boride carbides and nitride carbides. Other related compounds may contain more condensed anion combinations such as the carbidonitridosilicates with C(SiN_{3})_{4} with N bridging between two silicon atoms.

== Production ==
Silicide carbide compounds can be made by heating silicon, graphite, and metal together. It is important to exclude oxygen before and during the reaction. The flux method involves a reaction in a molten metal. Gallium is suitable, because it dissolves carbon and silicon, but does not react with them.

== Properties ==
Silicide carbides are a kind of ceramic, yet they also have metallic properties. They are not as brittle as most ceramics, but are stiffer than metals. They have high melting temperatures.

In air silicide carbide compounds are stable, and are hardly affected by water. The appearance is often metallic grey. When powdered the colour is dark grey.

When ErFe_{2}SiC is dissolved in acid, mostly methane is produced, but the products include some hydrocarbons with two and three carbon atoms.

The lanthanide contraction is evident with the cell sizes for rare earth element silicide carbides.

== List ==
formula	system	space group	unit cell Å, Z	volume	density	comment	ref
Al_{4}SiC_{4}	hexagonal	P6_{3}mc	a = 3.2746 c = 21.7081	201.59		band gap 2.2 eV	
Ti_{3}SiC_{2}	hexagonal	P6_{3}/mmc	a = 3.064 c = 17.65 Z=2	143.5	4.53	mp 2300°C	
Ti_{5}Si_{3}C_{x}							
Y_{3}Si_{2}C_{2}	orthorhombic	Cmmm	a=3.845 b=15.634 c=4.213	253.3		Pauli paramagnetic grey metallic air stable	
YB_{17.6}Si_{4.6}		R3m	a=10.0841 c=16.4714				
Y_{5}Si_{3}C_{1.8}							
Y_{1.8}C_{2}Si_{8}(B_{12})_{3}	rhombohedral	R3̅m	a=10.101, c=16.441, Z=3	1452.7	1.551		
YCr_{2}Si_{2}C	tetragonal	P4/mmm	a=3.998 c=5.289 Z=1			Pauli paramagnetic grey metallic	
YCr_{3}Si_{2}C							
YMn_{2}SiC	orthorhombic	Cmcm	Z=4				
YFe_{2}SiC	orthorhombic	Cmcm	Z=4	270		grey metallic air stable	
YRu_{2}SiC	orthorhombic	Cmcm	Z=4				
Ba_{3}Si_{4}C_{2}	tetragonal	I4/mcm	a = 8.7693 c = 12.3885			semiconductor; contains [Si_{4}]^{4−} and [C_{2}]^{2−}	
La_{3}Si_{2}C_{2}	orthorhombic	Cmmm	a=4.039,b=16.884, and c=4.506	307.3		grey metallic air stable	
LaCr_{2}Si_{2}C	tetragonal	P4/mmm	a=4.037 c=5.347 Z=1				
La_{2}Fe_{2}Si_{2}C	monoclinic	C2/m	Z=2				
Ce_{3}Si_{2}C_{2}	orthorhombic	Cmmm	a=3.990 b=16.592 c= 4.434	293.5		grey metallic air stable ?ferromagnetic (T_{C}=10K	
CeCr_{2}Si_{2}C	tetragonal	P4/mmm	a=4.020 c=5.284 Z=1			grey metallic	
Ce_{2}Fe_{2}Si_{2}C	monoclinic	C2/m	Z=2				
CeMo_{2}Si_{2}C							
CeRu_{2}SiC	orthorhombic	Cmcm	Z=4				
Pr_{3}Si_{2}C_{2}	orthorhombic	Cmmm	a=3.967 b=16.452 c=4.399	287.1		grey metallic air stable ferromagnetic T_{C}=25K	
PrCr_{2}Si_{2}C	tetragonal	P4/mmm	a=4.022, c = 5.352 Z=1	86.58	6.00	grey metallic Si-Si pair bond 2.453 Å	
PrMo_{2}Si_{2}C	tetragonal	P4/mmm	a=4.2139 c=5.4093 Z=1	96.1		metallic dark grey	
PrRu_{2}SiC	orthorhombic	Cmcm	Z=4				
Nd_{3}Si_{2}C_{2}	orthorhombic	Cmmm	a=3.949 b=16.303 c=4.375	281.7		grey metallic air stable ferromagnetic T_{C}=30K	
NdCr_{2}Si_{2}C	tetragonal	P4/mmm	a=4.026 c=5.336 Z=1			grey metallic	
NdRu_{2}SiC	orthorhombic	Cmcm	Z=4				
Sm_{3}Si_{2}C_{2}	orthorhombic	Cmmm	a=3.913 b=16.073 c=4.316	271.4		grey metallic air stable antiferromagnetic T_{N}=19K	
SmCr_{2}Si_{2}C	tetragonal	P4/mmm	a=4.011 c=5.321 Z=1			grey metallic	
SmMn_{2}SiC	orthorhombic	Cmcm	Z=4				
SmFe_{2}SiC	orthorhombic	Cmcm	Z=4	278		grey metallic air stable	
Sm_{2}Fe_{2}Si_{2}C	monoclinic	C2/m	Z=2				
SmRu_{2}SiC	orthorhombic	Cmcm	Z=4				
Gd_{3}Si_{2}C_{2}	orthorhombic	Cmmm	a=3.886 b=15.863 c=4.726			grey metallic air stable antiferromagnetic T_{N}=50K	
GdCr_{2}Si_{2}C	tetragonal	P4/mmm	a=4.007 c=5.324 Z=1	263.6		grey metallic	
GdCr_{3}Si_{2}C	hexagonal	P6/mmm					
GdMn_{2}SiC	orthorhombic	Cmcm	Z=4				
GdFe_{2}SiC	orthorhombic	Cmcm	Z=4	273		grey metallic air stable	
GdRu_{2}SiC	orthorhombic	Cmcm	a = 3.830, b = 11.069, c = 7.157 Z=4	303.4	8.745	silvery air stable	
Tb_{3}Si_{2}C_{2}	orthorhombic	Cmmm	a=3.854 c=15.702 c=4.236	256.3		grey metallic air stable antiferromagnetic T_{N}=28K	
Tb_{1.8}C_{2}Si_{8}(B_{12})_{3}	rhombohedral	R3̅m	a=10.1171, c=16.397, Z=3	1453.4	1.583		
TbCr_{2}Si_{2}C	tetragonal	P4/mmm	a=4.002 c=5.314 Z=1			grey metallic	
TbCr_{3}Si_{2}C	hexagonal	P6/mmm					
TbMn_{2}SiC	orthorhombic	Cmcm	Z=4				
TbFe_{2}SiC	orthorhombic	Cmcm	Z=4	270		grey metallic air stable	
TbRu_{2}SiC	orthorhombic	Cmcm	Z=4				
Dy_{3}Si_{2}C_{2}	orthorhombic	Cmmm	a=3.838 b=15.611 c=4.203	251.8		grey metallic air stable antiferromagnetic T_{N}=30K	
DyCr_{2}Si_{2}C	tetragonal	P4/mmm	a=3.999 c=5.306 Z=1			grey metallic	
DyCr_{3}Si_{2}C	hexagonal	P6/mmm					
DyMn_{2}SiC	orthorhombic	Cmcm	Z=4				
Dy_{2}Fe_{2}Si_{2}C	monoclinic	C2/m				grey metallic air stable	
DyFe_{2}SiC	orthorhombic	Cmcm	Z=4	269		grey metallic air stable	
DyRu_{2}SiC	orthorhombic	Cmcm	Z=4				
Ho_{3}Si_{2}C_{2}	orthorhombic	Cmmm	a=3.828 b=15.507 c=4.189	248.7		grey metallic air stable metamagnetic T_{N}=14K	
HoCr_{2}Si_{2}C	tetragonal	P4/mmm	a=3.996 c=5.274 Z=1			grey metallic	
HoCr_{3}Si_{2}C	hexagonal	P6/mmm					
HoMn_{2}SiC	orthorhombic	Cmcm	Z=4				
HoFe_{2}SiC	orthorhombic	Cmcm	Z=4	267		grey metallic air stable	
HoRu_{2}SiC	orthorhombic	Cmcm	Z=4				
Er_{3}Si_{2}C_{2}	orthorhombic	Cmmm	a=3.811 b=15.420 c=4.172	245.2		grey metallic air stable metamagnetic	
Er_{1.8}C_{2}Si_{8}(B_{12})_{3}	rhombohedral	R3̅m	a=10.0994, c=16.354, Z=3	1444.6	1.619		
ErCr_{3}Si_{2}C	hexagonal	P6/mmm					
ErMn_{2}SiC	orthorhombic	Cmcm	Z=4				
ErFe_{2}SiC	orthorhombic	Cmcm	Z=4	265		grey metallic air stable	
ErRu_{2}SiC	orthorhombic	Cmcm	Z=4				
Tm_{3}Si_{2}C_{2}	orthorhombic	Cmmm	a=3.796, b=15.328, c=4.145			grey metallic air stable metamagnetic	
TmCr_{3}Si_{2}C	hexagonal	P6/mmm					
TmMn_{2}SiC	orthorhombic	Cmcm	Z=4				
TmFe_{2}SiC	orthorhombic	Cmcm	Z=4	263		grey metallic air stable	
Tm_{2}Fe_{2}Si_{2}C	monoclinic	C2/m	a = 10.497, b = 3.882, c = 6.646, β = 128.96°			antiferromagnetic at T_{N} = 2.7 K metallic	
TmRu_{2}SiC	orthorhombic	Cmcm	Z=4				
LuCr_{3}Si_{2}C	hexagonal	P6/mmm					
LuMn_{2}SiC	orthorhombic	Cmcm	Z=4				
LuFe_{2}SiC	orthorhombic	Cmcm	Z=4	261		grey metallic air stable	
Lu_{2}Fe_{2}Si_{2}C	monoclinic	C2/m				Pauli paramagnetic metallic	
YRe_{2}SiC	orthorhombic	Cmcm	Z=4			superconductor T_{c} ≈ 5.9 K	
Y_{2}Re_{2}Si_{2}C	monoclinic	C2/m	Z=2				
La_{2}Re_{2}Si_{2}C	monoclinic	C2/m	Z=2				
CeRe_{2}SiC	orthorhombic	Cmcm	Z=4				
Ce_{2}Re_{2}Si_{2}C	monoclinic	C2/m	Z=2				
PrRe_{2}SiC	orthorhombic	Cmcm	Z=4				
NdRe_{2}SiC	orthorhombic	Cmcm	Z=4				
Nd_{2}Re_{2}Si_{2}C	monoclinic	C2/m	Z=2				
SmRe_{2}SiC	orthorhombic	Cmcm	Z=4				
Sm_{2}Re_{2}Si_{2}C	monoclinic	C2/m	Z=2				
GdRe_{2}SiC	orthorhombic	Cmcm	Z=4				
Gd_{2}Re_{2}Si_{2}C	monoclinic	C2/m	Z=2				
TbRe_{2}SiC	orthorhombic	Cmcm	Z=4				
Tb_{2}Re_{2}Si_{2}C	monoclinic	C2/m	Z=2				
DyRe_{2}SiC	orthorhombic	Cmcm	Z=4				
Dy_{2}Re_{2}Si_{2}C	monoclinic	C2/m	Z=2				
HoRe_{2}SiC	orthorhombic	Cmcm	Z=4				
Ho_{2}Re_{2}Si_{2}C	monoclinic	C2/m	Z=2				
ErRe_{2}SiC	orthorhombic	Cmcm	Z=4				
Er_{2}Re_{2}Si_{2}C	monoclinic	C2/m	Z=2				
TmRe_{2}SiC	orthorhombic	Cmcm	Z=4				
YOs_{2}SiC	orthorhombic	Cmcm	Z=4				
LaOs_{2}SiC	orthorhombic	Cmcm	Z=4				
CeOs_{2}SiC	orthorhombic	Cmcm	Z=4				
PrOs_{2}SiC	orthorhombic	Cmcm	a=3.9602,b=11.058,c=7.172 Z=4				
NdOs_{2}SiC	orthorhombic	Cmcm	Z=4				
SmOs_{2}SiC	orthorhombic	Cmcm	Z=4				
GdOs_{2}SiC	orthorhombic	Cmcm	Z=4				
TbOs_{2}SiC	orthorhombic	Cmcm	Z=4				
DyOs_{2}SiC	orthorhombic	Cmcm	Z=4				
HoOs_{2}SiC	orthorhombic	Cmcm	Z=4				
ErOs_{2}SiC	orthorhombic	Cmcm	Z=4				
TmOs_{2}SiC	orthorhombic	Cmcm	Z=4				
ThCr_{2}Si_{2}C	tetragonal						
ThMn_{2}SiC	orthorhombic	Cmcm	Z=4				
ThFe_{2}SiC	orthorhombic	Cmcm	a = 3.8632, b = 10.806, c = 6.950 Z=4	290	8.79	grey metallic air stable	
Th_{2}Fe_{2}Si_{2}C	monoclinic	C2/m	Z=2				
ThFe_{10}SiC_{2-x}	tetragonal		a = 10.053 and c = 6.516				
ThMo_{2}Si_{2}C	tetragonal	P4/mmm	a = 4.2296 c = 5.3571 Z=1	95.84		superconductor Tc=2.2K	
ThRu_{2}SiC	orthorhombic	Cmcm	Z=4				
ThRe_{2}SiC	orthorhombic	Cmcm	Z=4				
Th_{2}Re_{2}Si_{2}C	monoclinic	C2/m	a=11.1782, b=4.1753, c=7.0293, β=128.721° Z=2				
ThOs_{2}SiC	orthorhombic	Cmcm	Z=4				
U_{3}Si_{2}C_{2}	tetrahedral	I4/mmm	a=3.5735 c=18.882 Z=2	241.1	10.94	C-Si bond 1.93 Å Spin glass freeze at 28K grey metallic air stable	
U_{20}Si_{16}C_{3}	hexagonal	P6/mmm	a= 10.377 c= 8.005 Z= 1	746.5	11.67	grey metallic air stable	
UCr_{2}Si_{2}C	tetragonal	P4/mmm	a =3.983 c =5.160 Z=1	81.84	8.32		
UCr_{3}Si_{2}C	hexagonal	P6/mmm					
UMn_{2}SiC	orthorhombic	Cmcm	Z=4				
U_{0.92}Mn_{3}Si_{2}C	hexagonal	P6/mmm	a = 8.9463 c = 3.9367 Z=3	272.87	8.244	metallic	
UFe_{2}SiC	orthorhombic	Cmcm	Z=4	268		grey metallic air stable	
U_{2}MoSi_{2}C	tetragonal	P4/mbm	a = 6.67 c = 4.33				
UOs_{2}SiC	orthorhombic	Cmcm	Z=4				
