= Borate sulfide =

Class of chemical compounds

Borate sulfides are chemical mixed anion compounds that contain any kind of borate and sulfide ions. They are distinct from thioborates in which sulfur atoms replace oxygen in borates. There are also analogous borate selenides, with selenium ions instead of sulfur.

== List ==
name	chem	mw	crystal system	space group	unit cell	volume	density	comments	references
	Zn_{4}B_{6}O_{12}S			I4̅3m				NLO 1.9 × KDP	
cadmium sulfur boracite	Cd_{3}B_{7}O_{13}S_{2}		cubic	F4̅3c					
	La_{6}Nb_{2}MgSB_{8}O_{26}		trigonal	P3̅	a=8.2137 c =8.8601			clear	
	Ce_{6}Nb_{2}MgSB_{8}O_{26}		trigonal	P3̅	a=8.1672 c=8.8093			clear	
	Pr_{6}Nb_{2}MgSB_{8}O_{26}		trigonal	P3̅	a=8.1362 c=8.7716			yellowish green	
	Nd_{6}Nb_{2}MgSB_{8}O_{26}		trigonal	P3̅	a=8.1135 c=8.7469			clear	
EBOS	Eu_{2}B_{5}O_{9}S	534.03	orthorhombic	Pnn2	a=11.2909 b=11.3742 c=6.4440 Z=4	827.57	4.286	black	
EBOSI	Eu_{4.5}(B_{5}O_{9})_{2}SI	1238.88	orthorhombic	Pnn2	a=11.529 b=11.550 c=6.5070 Z=2	866.5	4.748	yellow-green band gap 1.98 eV	
EMSBO	Eu_{9}MgS_{2}B_{20}O_{41}	2328.27	Hexagonal	P6_{3}/m	a=8.2708 c=24.919 Z=2	1476.3	5.238	brown	
	Eu_{6}Ta_{2}MgSB_{8}O_{26}	1832.51	trigonal	P3̅	a=8.0431 c=8.6486 Z=1	484.53	6.280		
	Sm_{3}S_{3}BO_{3}	606.04	triclinic	P1̅	a=4.0173 b=7.647 c=11.241 α=91.339 β=91.275 γ=90.349 Z=2	345.14	5.832	green; band gap 2.5 eV	
	Gd_{3}S_{3}BO_{3}	626.74	triclinic	P1̅	a=3.9725 b=7.5945 c=11.182 α=91.402 β=91.093 γ=90.206 Z=2	337.30	6.173	pale yellow; band gap 2.65 eV	
