= Borate nitrate =

Borate nitrates are mixed anion compounds containing separate borate and nitrate anions.

== List ==
	chem	mw	crystal system	space group	unit cell Å	volume	density	comment	references
	Na_{3}(NO_{3})[B_{6}O_{10}]								
	K_{3}B_{6}O_{10}NO_{3}								
	K_{3}Na[B_{6}O_{9}(OH)_{3}]NO_{3}			Pnnm	a=13.208, b=9.107, c=12.325 Z=4				
	Co_{3}B_{7}O_{13}NO_{3}								
	[Co(H_{2}O)_{6}](NO_{3})_{2}·[Co{B_{3}O_{3}(OH)_{4}}_{2}(H_{2}O)_{4}]·2H_{2}O								
	[Ni(H_{2}O)_{6}](NO_{3})_{2}·[Ni{B_{3}O_{3}(OH)_{4}}_{2}(H_{2}O)_{4}]·2H_{2}O								
	Ni_{3}B_{7}O_{13}NO_{3}								
	K_{7}Ni[B_{18}O_{24}(OH)_{9}](NO_{3})_{6}· (H_{3}BO_{3})	1497.96	trigonal	R3̅	a=12.2229 c=54.784 Z=6	7088	2.11	green	
	Cu_{3}B_{7}O_{13}NO_{3}								
	Zn_{3}B_{7}O_{13}NO_{3}								
	[Zn(H_{2}O)_{6}](NO_{3})_{2}·[Zn{B_{3}O_{3}(OH)_{4}}_{2}(H_{2}O)_{4}]·2H_{2}O		monoclinic	P2_{1}/c	a = 11.282, b = 6.5374, c = 17.668, β = 100.981°				
	Rb_{3}(NO_{3})[B_{6}O_{10}]								
	Ag_{12}(B_{9}O_{18})(NO_{3})_{3}		hexagonal	P6_{3}/m	a = 11.2896 c = 11.6693				
	Cd_{3}B_{7}O_{13}NO_{3}								
	La[B_{5}O_{8}(OH)]NO_{3}								
	La[B_{5}O_{8}(OH)]NO_{3}·2H_{2}O		monoclinic	P2_{1}/n	a=6.540, b=15.550, c=10.672, β=90.44° and Z=4				
cerium(III) aquahydroxidooctaoxidopentaborate nitrate dihydrate	Ce[B_{5}O_{8}(OH)(H_{2}O)]NO_{3}·2H_{2}O	455.24	monoclinic	P2_{1}/n	a=6.444 b=15.572 c=10.745 β=90.395 Z=4	1078.2	2.904	colourless	
	Pr[B_{5}O_{8}(OH)(H_{2}O)_{x}]NO_{3}·2H_{2}O		monoclinic	P2_{1}/n	a=6.419, b=15.518, c=10.684, with β=90.54° Z=4	1064.3			
	Pr_{7}(BO_{3})_{3}(NO_{3})N_{3}O		hexagonal	P6_{3}	a=10.6834 c=6.6752 Z=2		6.457	green; contains N(OBO_{3})_{3} clusters, oxide and nitride	
	Nd_{7}(BO_{3})_{3}(NO_{3})N_{3}O		hexagonal	P6_{3}	a=10.6446 c=6.6339 Z=2		6.664	purplish-blue;contains N(OBO_{3})_{3} clusters oxide, and nitride;SHG	
	Nd[B_{5}O_{8}(OH)(H_{2}O)_{x}]NO_{3}·2H_{2}O			P2_{1}/n	a = 6.4285, b = 15.5258, c = 10.7052, β = 90.39°	1068.44			
	Sm[B_{5}O_{8}(OH)(H_{2}O)_{x}]NO_{3}·2H_{2}O			P2_{1}/n	a = 6.4409, b = 15.4199, c = 10.5097, β = 90.33°	1043.79			
	Lu_{2}B_{2}O_{5}(NO_{3})_{2}·2H_{2}O		triclinic	P1	a=7.8952, b=9.8862, c=14.6033, α=90.83, β=101.75, γ=110.02° Z=4				
	Pb_{2}(BO_{3})(NO_{3})	535.20	hexagonal	P6_{3}mc	a=5.0731 c=13.040 Z=2	290.64	6.116	colourless SHG 9×KDP	
	[Pb_{3}(B_{3}O_{7})](NO_{3})	828.01		Pnma	a=10.3481 b=7.8908 c=11.2123 Z=4	914.54	6.007	colourless	
