= Arsenide hydride =

Class of chemical compounds

An arsenide hydride or hydride arsenide is a chemical compound containing hydride (H^{−}) and arsenide (As^{3−}) ions in a single phase. They are in the class of mixed anion compounds.

== Preparation ==
Arsenide hydride compounds may be produced by heating metal hydride and metal arsenide mixtures under pressure.

== Properties ==
Arsenide hydrides are under investigation as unconventional superconductors.

The hydride ions can be replaced by fluoride or oxide ions to yield variations in composition.

== Reactions ==
when heated to 800° CaFeAsH forms three phases.

2CaFeAsH → Ca + CaFe_{2}As_{2} + H_{2}

name	formula	form	space group	unit cell	volume	density	appearance	properties	reference
	LiCa_{3}As_{2}H	orthorhombic	Pnma	a = 11.4064(7) Å, b = 4.2702(3) Å, c = 11.8762 Z=4			red	band gap 1.4 eV	
	Ca_{14}As_{6}C_{0.5},NH_{5}	tetragonal	P4/mbm	a = 15.749, c = 9.1062, Z = 4			red	band gap 1.6 eV	
	CaFeAsH	tetragonal	P4/nmm	a = 0.3878 c = 0.8260				superconductor	
	CaFeAsF_{1−x}H_{x}							non superconductor	
	CaFe_{1−x}Co_{x}AsH	tetragonal	P4/nmm	a increases and c decreases with x				superconducting 23 K at x= 0.09	
	K_{2}Cr_{3}As_{3}H								
	K_{1−δ}Cr_{3}As_{3}H_{x} x<0.45							Superconductor Tc=5.8 K	
Lithium tristrontium diarsenide hydride	Sr_{3}LiAs_{2}H	orthorhombic	Pnma	a = 12.034, b = 4.4698, c = 12.5907; V = 677.2 Å^{3}				Zintl phase; semiconductor; diamagnetic	
	LaFeAsO_{1−x}H_{x} (x<0.53)							superconductor T_{c}=36 K with x=0.3	
	La_{2}Ti_{2}As_{2}H_{2.3}	tetragonal	I4/mmm	a=3.9595 c=18.0986	283.742				
	La_{2}V_{2}As_{2}H_{x}	tetragonal	I4/mmm	a=3.9561 c=17.909	280.030				
	La_{2}Cr_{2}As_{2}H_{x}	tetragonal	I4/mmm	a=3.9934 c=17.380	277.17				
	La_{2}Mn_{2}As_{2}H_{x}	tetragonal	I4/mmm	a=4.0556 c=17.46	287.2				
	LaMnAsO1−xHx (x=0−0.73)							ferromagnetic	
	CoLaAsH_{0.78x}	orthorhombic	I4_{1}md	a=4.1739 c=14.64	254.8			black	
	NiLaAsH_{0.69}	orthorhombic	I4_{1}md	a=4.1660 c=14.5993	253.37			black	
	CuLaAsH_{0.78}	orthorhombic	I4_{1}md	a=4.2302 c=14.5780	260.86	7.08		black	
	LaZn_{0.5}AsH_{x}	hexagonal	P6/mmm	a=4.200 c=4.244	64.81			black	
	CeFeAsO_{1−x}H_{x} (x<0.5)	tetragonal	P4/nmm	a=3.95386 c=8.5926 at x=0.4				superconducting 0.1 < x < 0.4; T_{c}=47 K with x=0.25	
	NdFeAs(O,H)							superconductor Tc=40K	
	SmFeAsO_{1−x}H_{x} (x<0.5)							superconductor Tc=55 K at x = 0.2.	
	Sm_{2}Mn_{2}As_{2}H_{x}	tetragonal	I4/mmm	a=3.9251 c=16.67	256.7				
	GdFeAsO_{1−x}H_{x}								
