= Telluride iodide =

Class of chemical compounds

The telluride iodides are chemical compounds that contain both telluride ions (Te^{2−}) and iodide ions (I^{−}). They are in the class of mixed anion compounds or chalcogenide halides.

Tellurium does not normally bond with iodine, but can form many different units with bonds to other tellurium atoms.

== List ==
name	formula	system	space group	unit cell	volume	density	properties	ref
Copper telluride iodide	CuTeI	tetrahedral	I4_{1}/amd	a = 17.170, c = 4.876, and Z = 16			Cu^{+1} ion conductor; metallic grey	
	(CuI)_{3}Cu_{2}TeS_{3}		P3_{1}21					
gallium telluride iodide	GaTeI	orthorhombic					band gap 2.55	
	Ge_{40.0}Te_{5.3}I_{8}	cubic	Pm3̅n	a=10.815 Z = 1	1265.0	6.023	band gap 0.8 eV; clathrate	
α-Arsenic telluride iodide	AsTeI	monoclinic	P2_{1}	a=8.965 b=4.042 c=10.341 β=90.75 Z=4		5.84	melt 281 °C black	
β-Arsenic telluride iodide	AsTeI	cubic	Fm3m	a=5.791 Z=2		5.63	black metallic	
	As_{4}Te_{5}I_{2}	monoclinic		a=14.58 b=4.00 c=12.26 β=95.0 Z=2		5.51	melt 303 °C metallic	
triniobium telluride heptaiodide	Nb_{3}TeI_{7}							
	NbTe_{4}I		P2_{1}/c	a=7.695 b=15.393 c=13.438 β=100.84 Z=8	1563.2	6.205	black metallic	
diniobium hexatelluride iodide	Nb_{2}Te_{6}I		P2_{1}/c	a=9.197 b=13.387 c=9.651 β=112.36	1093.8	6.548		
	Nb_{4}Te_{12}I	monoclinic	C12/c1	a=21.957 b=6.147 c=19.925 β=122.40 Z=4	2270.6	5.8	black	
	Nb_{4}Te_{17}I_{4}	monoclinic	C2/c	a = 16.199 b = 8.128 c = 27.355 β = 110.84°, Z = 4			black metallic	
	Mo_{3}Te_{l0}I_{l0}							
	[Mo_{3}Se7(TeI_{3})I_{2}]I	monoclinic	P2_{3}/n	a=10.4969 b=13.029 c=16.567 β =102.921° Z=4	2208.3	5.202		
	[Mo_{3}Te_{7}(TeI_{3})_{3}]_{2}(I)(TeI_{3})	triclinic	P1̅	a=11.2148 b=11.6550 c=16.6798 α=92.124 β=102.223 γ=117.427 Z=	1868.4	5.374		
Palladium telluride iodide	PdTeI			a=7.821 c=5.659			brass yellow	
	Ag_{23}Te_{12}I	orthorhombic	Pnnm				honeycomb Te	
	Ag_{19}Te_{6}Br_{5.4}I_{1.6}	orthorhombic	Pnma				electric conductor	
indium telluride iodide	InTeI	monoclinic	P21/c					
Antimony telluride iodide	SbTeI	triclinic	P1̅					
	(Sb_{2}Te_{2})I[AlI_{4}]	monoclinic	P2_{1}/n					
	La_{2}TeI_{2}	rhombohedral	R3̅m	a = 4.5074 c = 32.528 Z = 3			metallic	
	Er_{17.3}Te_{24}I_{8}		Fd3m	a=12.020				
	Ta_{3}TeI_{7}	hexagonal	P6_{3}mc					
	[TaTe_{4}]_{4}[PtI_{6}]I_{2}	triclinic	P1̅	a=16.831 b=17.740 c=19.018 α=93.57 β=94.08 γ=102.09 Z=1	977.65			
	TaTe_{4}I	triclinic	P1̅	a=6.679 b=7.787 c=8.581 α=112.76 β=102.60 γ=101.25 Z=2	381.8	7.118	black	
	W_{2}Cl_{12}Te_{6}I_{2}							
Gold telluride iodide	AuITe	monoclinic		a=7.317 b=7.626 c=7.249 β=106.33		7.73	semiconductor band gap 0.9 grey melt 360 °C	
Gold telluride diiodide	AuITe_{2}	orthorhombic	Pmmb	a = 4.056 Å, b = 12.579 Å, c = 4.741 Å, Z = 2	241.9	7.989	silvery white conductor melt 440 °C	
	Hg_{3}Te_{2}I_{2}						greyish red	
	Hg_{3}Te_{2}BrI	monoclinic	C2	18.376 b=9.587 c=10.575 β=100.11°				
	Hg_{3}TeI_{4}	cubic	F4̅3m	a=6.244 Z=(80% partial occupancy)	243.4	7.03	decompose 273 °C dark ruby red	
Bismuth telluride iodide	BiTeI		P3m1 / Pnma				over 3.9 GPa Weyl semimetal; under semimetal	
	ThTe_{2}I_{2}	monoclinic	C2/m	a = 7.642 b = 14.336 c = 7.727 and β = 111.27° Z = 4				
	[Ta_{7}(Se_{2})_{14}][U_{2}I_{10}]_{2}	orthorhombic	Cccm	a = 21.5134 b = 22.1619 and c = 16.7834 Z=4				
