= Telluride oxide =

Class of chemical compounds

The telluride oxides or oxytellurides are double salts that contain both telluride and oxide anions (Te^{2−} and O^{2−}). They are in the class of mixed anion compounds.

Compounds that can be mistakenly called "telluride oxides" are tellurium dioxide and tellurite.

Some of these are under investigation as photovoltaic materials, e.g. oxygen doped zinc telluride.

== Structure ==
Due to the different size and chemical nature of Te^{2−} and O^{2−} the ions occupy different positions in the crystal structure. Some of these structures are layered.

Many of the crystal systems are tetragonal. One unusual structure has stacked tubes made from tellurium, with nested tubes of antimony oxide, which contain alkali metal.

== List ==
name	formula	MW	ratio Te:O	system	space group	unit cell Å	volume	density	optical	band gap	CAS	references
	V_{2}Te_{2}O		2:1	tetragonal		a = 3.9282 and c = 13.277						
	KV_{3}Te_{3}O_{0.42}			hexagonal	P6_{3}/m	a=9.62, c=4.48	359					
	Rb_{0.8}V_{2}Te_{2}O		2:1									
	Sr_{2}MnO_{2}Cu_{1.82}Te_{2}				I4/mmm	a=4.200933 c=19.28303	340.304					
	Sr_{2}CoO_{2}Cu_{2}Te_{2}				I4/mmm	a=4.152337 c=19.54645	337.018					
oxygen doped zinc telluride	ZnTe_{1−x}O_{x}											
	Ga_{2}O_{2.95}Te_{0.05}											
Tetragadolinium bis[tetraoxidosilicate(IV)] oxide telluride	Gd_{4}(SiO_{4})_{2}OTe	956.78		orthorhombic	Pnma	a=12.495 b=10.8683 c=6.8075 Z=4	924.5	6.874	colourless			
Niobium iodide oxide telluride	Nb_{4}I_{4}Te_{9}O											
Antimony copper oxide telluride	CuSbTeO											
dibarium cobalt disilver dioxide ditelluride	Ba_{2}CoO_{2}Ag_{2}Te_{2}	836.52	2:2	tetragonal	I4/mmm							
	Be3Cd4Ge3O12Te										12449-27-3	
SBC-1	(K_{6}(H_{2}O)_{6}Sb_{12}O_{18})_{3}Te_{36}					tellurium tubes						
RB-CTH-1	Rb_{18}Sb_{36}O_{54}(SbTe_{3})_{2}(Te_{2})_{6}					tellurium tubes						
	Ba_{2}TeO		1:1	tetragonal	P4/nmm	a=5.0337, c=9.9437, Z=2			semiconductor	2.93		
	LaCuOTe		1:1	tetragonal	P4/nmm	a = 4.1775, c = 9.326	162.75			2.31		
	CeCuOTe		1:1	tetragonal	P4/nmm	a = 4.1497, c = 9.309	160.30					
	La_{2}O_{2}Te		1:2	tetragonal	I4/mmm	a=4.1231 c=13.096 Z=2		6.525				
	Ce_{2}O_{2}Te		1:2	tetragonal	I4/mmm	a=4.0817 c=12.947 Z=2		6.772				
	CeOCuTe							7.39				
	Pr_{2}O_{2}Te		1:2		I4/mmm	a=4.0562 c=12.858	211.5	6.930				
	PrOCuTe							7.32				
	NdCuOTe		1:1	tetragonal	P4/nmm	a = 4.1056, c = 9.332	157.30			2.26		
	Nd_{2}O_{2}Te		1:2	tetragonal	I4/mmm	a=4.0308 c=12.771		7.172				
samarium(III) oxide telluride	Sm_{2}TeO_{2}		1:2	tetragonal	I4/mmm	a=3.9983 c=12.655		7.556				
	Eu_{2}TeO_{2}		1:2	tetragonal	I4/mmm	a=3.9756 c=12.579 Z=2		7.743				
	Gd_{2}TeO_{2}		1:2	tetragonal	I4/mmm	a=3.9620 c=12.532 Z=2		8.004				
	Tb_{2}TeO_{2}		1:2	tetragonal	I4/mmm	a=3.9389 c=12.454 Z=2		8.206			89800-88-4	
	Dy_{2}TeO_{2}		1:2	tetragonal	I4/mmm	a=3.9234 c=12.403 Z=2		8.430				
	Ho_{2}TeO_{2}			orthorhombic	Cmc21	a=3.8505 b=12.9004 c=4.0521 Z=2		8.075				
	Er_{2}TeO_{2}			orthorhombic	Cmc21	a=3.8263 b=12.8297 c=4.0240 Z=2		8.307				
	BiOCuTe		1:1	tetragonal	P4/nmm	a=4.04200 c=9.5234						
	Bi_{2}O_{2}Te		1:2	tetragonal	I4/mmm	a=3.98025 c=12.7039			semiconductor	0.23		
thorium oxytelluride	ThOTe	375.64	1:1	tetragonal	P4/nmm	a=4.1173 c=7.5289 Z=2	127.63	9.775	black	1.45		
	UOTe		1:1	tetragonal	P4/nmm	a=4.004 c=7.491						
	U_{4}O_{4}Te_{3}		3:4	tetragonal	I4/mmm	a=4.010 c=27.54 Z=2						
	U_{2}O_{2}Te		1:2									
neptunium oxide telluride	Np_{2}TeO_{2}		1:2	Tetragonal	I4/mmm	a=4.003 c=12.73 Z=2						
	Pu_{2}TeO_{2}		1:2	tetragonal	I4/mmm	a = 4.008, c = 12.659 Z=2	203.4	10.58		0.65		
	Am_{2}TeO_{2}			tetragonal	I4/mmm	a=3.994 c=12.72						
	Cm_{2}TeO_{2}				I4/mmm	a=3.98 c=12.58						
