= Arsenide nitride =

Class of chemical compounds

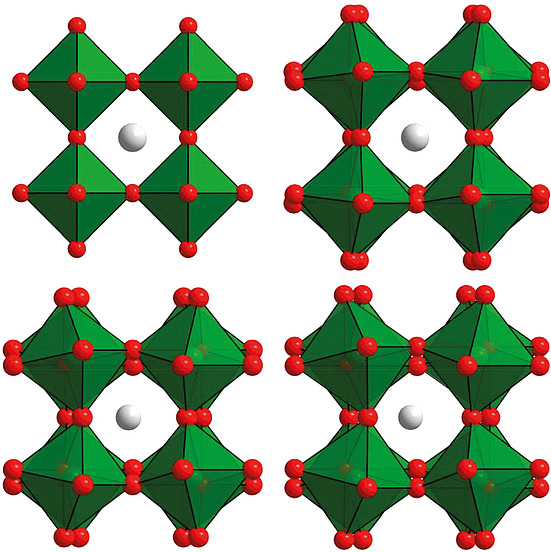
Cubic Mg_{3}AsN, orthorhombic Ca_{3}AsN Sr_{3}AsN and Ba_{3}AsN showing increased distortion as alkaline earth metal increases in size.

Arsenide nitrides or nitride arsenides are compounds containing anions composed of nitride (N^{3−}) and arsenide (As^{3−}). They can be considered as mixed anion compounds or mixed pnictide compounds. Related compounds include the arsenide phosphides, germanide arsenides, arsenide carbides, and phosphide nitrides.

Arsenide and nitride are quite different in size, so alloys are challenging to produce. They can be produced by heating an arsenide compound with a nitride, under pressure so that nitrogen does not escape.

== List ==
| name | formula | crystal system | space group | unit cell Å | volume | density | comment | ref |
|---|---|---|---|---|---|---|---|---|
| | Mg_{3}AsN | cubic | Pm3̅m | a =4.2148 Z=1 | 74.88 | 3.589 | orange | |
| | Ca_{3}AsN | orthorhombic | Pbnm | a=6.725 b=6.7198 c=9.5335 Z=4 | 430.8 | 3.237 | red; moisture sensitive | |
| | Ca_{14}As_{6}C_{0.445}N_{1.135}H_{4.915} | | P4/mbm | a = 15.749 c = 9.1062 | | | red; band gap 1.6 eV | |
| | Cr_{3}AsN | tetragonal | I4/mcm | a=5.360 c=8.066 | | | | |
| gallium arsenide nitride | Ga(As,N) | | | | | | | |
| indium gallium arsenide nitride | (In,Ga)(As,N) | | | | | | | |
| aluminium gallium arsenide nitride | (Al,Ga)(As,N) | | | | | | | |
| | Sr_{3}AsN | orthorhombic | Pbnm | a=7.1856 b=10.1446 c=7.1464 Z=4 | 520.93 | 4.486 | dark grey | |
| | Ba_{3}AsN | orthorhombic | Pbnm | a=7.6741 b=10.7573 c=7.5387 Z=4 | 622.33 | 5.347 | black | |
| | LaFe_{2}AsN | orthorhombic | Cmcm | a =3.79932 b =11.11461 c =7.18656 | 303.474 | | | |
| | LaCo_{2}AsN | orthorhombic | Cmcm | a =3.75993 b =11.1674 c =7.0185 | 294699 | | | |
| | LaNi_{2}AsN | orthorhombic | Cmcm | a =3.71584 b =11.4147 c =6.9786 | 296.004 | | | |
| | Th_{2}ONAs | | P3̅m1 | a=4.041 c=6.979 | | | | |
| | ThCrAsN | | | | | | metallic | |
| | ThMnAsN | tetragonal | P4/nmm | a =4.0818 b =4.0818 c =8.947 | | | metallic | |
| | ThFeAsN | tetragonal | P4/nmm | a = 4.0367 c = 8.5262 | | | superconductor Tc 30 K | |
| | ThFe_{1−x}Co_{x}AsN | | | | | | superconductivity lost for x>0.05 | |
| | ThNiAsN | tetragonal | P4/nmm | a=4,0804 c=7.9888 | | | superconductor at 4.3K | |
| | BaTh_{2}Fe_{4}As_{4}(N_{0.7}O_{0.3})_{2} | | | a=3.9886 c=29.853 | | | Tc 22K | |
| | U_{2}N_{2}As | | P3̅m1 | a=3.833 c=6.737 | | | | |
