= Fluorohydride salt =

Fluorohydride salts are ionic compounds containing a mixture of fluoride and hydride anions, generally with strongly electropositive metal cations. Unlike other types of mixed hydrides such as oxyhydrides, fluorohydride salts are typically solid solutions because of the similar sizes and identical charges of fluoride and hydride ions.

== Examples ==
Fluorohydride salts typically contain one or more alkali or alkaline earth metals whose parent fluorides and hydrides are predominantly ionic. Examples with a single metal counterion include Li(H,F), Na(H,F), Mg(H,F)_{2}, Ca(H,F)_{2}, Sr(H,F)_{2}, and Ba(H,F)_{2}. ( More complex fluorohydride salts include the perovskite-structured NaMg(H,F)_{3} and MCa(H,F)_{3} (M = Rb or Cs), and the high-pressure pyrochlore compound NaCaMg_{2}(H,F)_{7}.

== Applications ==
Fluorohydride salts have drawn interest as thermoelectric storage materials because their continuous solid-solution range enables balancing of hydrogen-storage capacity with thermal stability. Replacing hydride with fluoride ions in solid solution reduces the hydrogen-storage capacity of the compound but also reduces the hydrogen-dissociation pressure, enabling higher-temperature operation. With sodium fluorohydride, the maximum rate of hydrogen release (and thus pressure buildup) is found to be 443 °C for the solid solution with 1:1 H:F ratio, versus 408 °C for the pure sodium hydride. A cost comparison reveals that a hydrofluoride salt with the composition NaMgH_{2}F can be operated at lower cost than the parent hydride NaMgH_{3} and other magnesium-hydride based materials, despite its lower hydrogen-storage capacity, because of the improved stability of the fluorohydride salt at high temperature.
