= Iodide hydride =

Class of chemical compounds

Iodide hydrides are mixed anion compounds containing hydride and iodide anions. Many iodide hydrides are cluster compounds, containing a hydrogen atom in a core, surrounded by a layer of metal atoms, encased in a shell of iodide.

== List ==
formula	system	space group	unit cell Å	volume	density	comment	reference
(^{Dipp}Nacnac)Mg(μ-H)(μ-I)Mg(^{Mes}Nacnac)							
KHI							
[LZnI(η^{2}-H)]_{2} (L=1,3-bis(2,6-diisopropylphenyl)inidazole-2-ylidine							
Sr_{2}H_{3}I	trigonal	P3̅m1	a = 4.260 c = 7.749 Z=1	121.77	4.16	transparent	
YIH			C=31.033			metallic	
YIH_{2}		P3m1	a = 3.8579, c = 10.997			light green	
Nb_{6}I_{11}H		D10/2h	a = 11.317; b = 15.471 ; c = 13.431				
Nb_{6}I_{11}H		Im3̅m	a = 11.317; b = 15.471 ; c = 13.431			black	
Nb_{6}(H)I_{9}S	triclinic	P1	a = 10.340, b = 11.554, c = 10.181, α = 104.31°, β = 113.50°, γ = 105.48° Z=2				
HCsNb_{6}I_{11}							
Ba_{2}H_{3}I	trigonal	P3̅m1	a= 4.519 c= 8.1184			transparent	
Ba_{5}H_{2}I_{4}O_{2}	orthorhombic	Cmcm	a =17.210, b = 14.525 c = 6.3903 Z=4	1597.44	5.11	transparent	
LaI_{2}H	hexagonal	P6_{3}/mmc	a=4.2158 c=15.508				
Cel_{2}H_{0.90}		R3m					
Cel_{2}D_{0.96}		R3m					
NdI_{2}H							
GdI_{2}H_{0.97}		R3m				transparent blue	
Gd_{2}ICH_{0.73}		P6_{3}mc	a=3.8128 C=14.844 Z=2		8.071		
Eu_{2}H_{3}I						dark red	
Eu_{5}H_{2}O_{2}I_{4}	orthorhombic	Cmcm	a = 16.3697, b = 13.6954, c = 6.0436, Z = 4			dark red	
Tb_{2}ICH							
DyI_{2}H							
[(η^{5}-C_{5}H_{5})W(NO)IH]_{2}							
(η^{5}-C_{5}H_{5})W(NO)I(H)(P(OPh)_{3})							
Ir(η^{2}-H_{2})(H)_{2}I(P^{i}Pr_{3})_{2}							
Ir(η^{2}-H_{2})(H)_{2}I(P^{i}Pr_{3})_{2}•C_{10}H_{8}	triclinic	P1̅	a=7.999 b=13.981 c=14.561 α=82.49° β=84.39° γ=71.70° Z=2			15K	
