= Phosphide silicide =

Phosphide silicides or silicide phosphides or silicophosphides are compounds containing anions composed of silicide (Si^{4−}) and phosphide (P^{3−}). They can be considered as mixed anion compounds. They are distinct from the phosphidosilicates, which have the phosphorus bonded to the silicon. Related compounds include the phosphide carbides, germanide phosphides, nitride silicides, and antimonide silicides.

One preparation method is to heat a metal phosphide with silicon in a silica tube. Phosphorus must be prevented from evaporating. Another method is to use a liquid tin flux.

Phosphide silicides may be present as minerals. They are under investigation as photovoltaic materials.

== List ==
formula	system	space group	unit cell Å	volume	density	comment	ref
Li_{10.68}Si_{5}P	orthorhombic	Pnma	a = 10.2434, b = 4.2788, c = 23.9767 Z=4	1050.89	1.52	grey metallic; Si_{5} rings	
Fe_{5}PSi	hexagonal	P6_{3}cm	a=6.766 c=12.456 Z=6	493.83	6.82		
Fe_{5}(P,Si)_{3}							
Fe_{7}(P,Si)_{3}							
(Fe,Ni)_{8}(P,Si)_{3}		R3̅m	a = 6.6525 c = 37.998 Z = 6	1456.3		Perryite	
Ni_{2}PSi	orthorhombic	Pbca	a=4.985 b=5.871 c=13.667	399.95	5.86		
ZrCuSiP		P4/nmm	a=3.5671 c=9.4460			metallic	
La_{4}(P_{1−x}Si_{x})_{3-z}	cubic	I4̅3d					
Ce_{4}(P_{1−x}Si_{x})_{3-z}	cubic	I4̅3d					
Ce_{4}P_{1.77}Si_{1.23}	cubic	I4̅3d	a=8.9359 Z=4	713.53	6.0474	black	
Pr_{4}(P_{1−x}Si_{x})_{3-z}	cubic	I4̅3d					
Nd_{4}(P_{1−x}Si_{x})_{3-z}	cubic	I4̅3d					
Gd_{4}Co_{13}(Si, P)_{9}		P6̅m2	a = 10.419, c = 37.27				
Sm_{4}Co_{13}(Si, P)_{9}		P6̅m2					
Tb_{4}Co_{13}(Si, P)_{9}		P6̅m2					
Dy_{4}Co_{13}(Si, P)_{9}		P6̅m2					
Ho_{4}Co_{13}(Si, P)_{9}		P6̅m2					
Er_{4}Co_{13}(Si, P)_{9}		P6̅m2					
Hf_{27}Si_{6}P_{10}		Immm	a = 3.5739, b = 18.623, c = 23.081, Z = 2		11.443	P_{2} groups	
