= Praseodymium(V) oxide nitride =

Names
- Other names: Praseodymium oxide nitride; Praseodymium nitride oxide

Identifiers
CAS Number	259684-40-7
3D model (JSmol)	Interactive image
- InChI: InChI=1S/N.O.Pr Key: JBLQFJMZHFUYOA-UHFFFAOYSA-N
- SMILES: O=[Pr]#N

Properties
Chemical formula	PrNO
Molar mass	170.91 g/mol
Melting point	−261 °C (−437.8 °F; 12.1 K) (decomposes)

Structure
Molecular shape	linear
- Except where otherwise noted, data are given for materials in their standard state (at 25 °C [77 °F], 100 kPa). Infobox references

Praseodymium(V) oxide nitride is a compound of praseodymium in the oxidation state of +5 with the chemical formula PrNO. It was first reported in 2000. However, the compound was not verified to have an oxidation state of +5 until 2017. This compound is produced by the reaction of praseodymium metal and nitric oxide in 4K and solid neon. The crystal structure is linear with the praseodymium forming a triple bond with the nitrogen and a double bond with the oxygen. Calculation shows a significant level of f-orbital covalence of Pr-X bonds.

== Reactions ==
Praseodymium(V) oxide nitride further reacts with nitric oxide to form complexes such as NPrO(NO) and NPrO(NO)_{2} which shows that this compound is a lewis acid. This compound also decomposes to praseodymium(IV) oxide and nitrogen:

PrNO → PrO_{2} + N_{2}

== See also ==
- Oxynitride
