= Oxycarbide =

A carbide oxide or oxycarbide is a mixed anion compound that contains oxide O^{2−} and carbon containing anions. These compounds are distinct from carbonates, carbonites, or carbonyls, which have covalent bonds between carbon and oxygen.

== Properties ==
Many oxycarbides can have a range of compositions with substitution of some carbon by oxygen, or vice-versa. For example with zirconium there are carbide oxides with formulas in the range ZrC_{x}O_{2(1-x)}, varying from ZrC to ZrO_{2}. But also there are others more zirconium rich with formulas ZrC_{x}O_{y} where x + y ≤ 1.

== Use ==
Oxycarbides are investigated for their catalytic activity. They can catalyse formation of hydrocarbons from hydrogen and carbon monoxide, or to form benzene and hydrogen from methane, or to form hydrogen from organic substances.

They are also important in metallurgy, as an intermediate product when carbon is used to reduce metal oxides. When hot metallic carbides are exposed to oxygen they can also form oxycarbides. Because of their hardness and high melting point, they are difficult to analyse.

Since rare earth oxycarbides are electrically conductive, they can be used as electrodes in the electrochemical production of metals. Titanium oxycarbide has been investigated as a fuel cell electrode.

== Production ==
Oxycarbides may be produced by an incomplete reaction of a metal oxide with carbon.Metal carbides can oxidise at high temperature with the addition of oxygen, yielding an oxycarbide, and carbon monoxide.

Less common methods of production are electrochemical, reduction by methane, heating a metal organic framework, or decomposing a metal carbonyl compound.

== Related ==
Related compounds include oxycarbonitride.

== List ==
formula	system	space group	unit cell Å	volume	density	comment	reference
BOC?						B and O sub for C in graphene	
Al_{2}OC							
Al_{4}O_{4}C	orthorhombic	Cmc2_{1}				melt 2213K	
silicon oxycarbide							
ScO_{0.39}C_{0.56}							
ScC_{0.30}O_{0.70}			a=4.536				
ScC_{0.56}O_{0.08}			a=4.6707				
Sc_{2}OC	cubic	Fm3̅m	a=4.561	94.88		water sensitive, forms CH_{4}	
TiOC							
TiC_{0.545}O_{0.08}	cubic	Fd3m				<990K	
TiC_{0.545}O_{0.08}	trigonal					disordered phase > 990K	
TiO_{0.5}C_{0.5}						electric conductor	
Ti_{2⁢}AlC_{1−𝑥⁢}O_{𝑥}						MAX phase	
VO(_{0.52-0.46})C(_{0.23-0.37})							
Cr_{2}CO	cubic						
Sr_{21}Si_{2}O_{6}C_{6}	cubic	Fd3̅m	a=1914.6 Z=8	7018	3.877	metallic brass	
Y_{2}OC	cubic		a=4.9480				
ZrC_{0.94}O_{0.05}	cubic		a=4.695				
ZrO_{0.31} C_{0.69}							
NbC_{x}O_{y}	cubic		a=4.469				
Mo_{2}CO_{x}						nanosheet	
Mo_{0.9}V_{2}C_{1.9}O_{1.5}	cubic	Fm3m					
MoCrCO?	cubic	Fm3m					
MoFeC_{0.49}O_{0.58}	hexagonal	P6_{3}/mmc					
Mo_{0.9}NiC_{0.46}O_{0.14}							
Mo_{2.4}Nb_{2}C_{4.7}O_{2.6}	cubic	Fm3m					
Gd_{13}Fe_{10}C_{12}O							
Yb_{2}OC	cubic		a=4.857				
HfOxCy							
WO_{0.81}C_{0.97}	hexagonal	like α-WC	a=2.908 c=2.85				
WFeCO?	cubic	Fd3m					
WVCO?	cubic	Fm3m					
WCoCO?	cubic	Fd3m					
WNbC_{1.3}O	cubic	Fm3m					
WMoCO_{1.9}	hexagonal	P6_{3}/mmc					
UC_{0.4}O_{0.6}						electric conductor	
UC_{x}O_{2-x}							
UC_{1-x}O_{x}							
PuC_{0.5}O_{0.3}						film	

"?" in formula means ratio of elements unspecified.
