= Telluride bromide =

Class of chemical compounds

The telluride bromides are chemical compounds that contain both telluride ions (Te^{2−}) and bromide ions (Br^{−}). They are in the class of mixed anion compounds or chalcogenide halides.

In many tellurium bromide compounds, tellurium atoms link up in a helix, similar to pure tellurium structure. In Rhenium compounds tellurium atoms form a cluster with rhenium atoms. In some materials, tellurium forms a honeycomb like structure containing tubes filled with bromine and the other elements.

== List ==
name	formula	system	space group	unit cell Å	volume	density	properties	ref
	Sb_{2}Te_{2}BrAlCl_{4}	monoclinic	C2/c					
copper telluride bromide	CuBrTe	tetragonal	I4_{1}/amd	a = 16.417 c = 4.711 Z = 16	1269.7	5.67	black	
	MoTe_{4}Br						silver	
	Mo_{4}Te_{7}Br_{8}						black semiconductor	
	MoTe_{6}Br_{3}						silver	
	[Mo_{3}Se_{7}(TeBr_{3})Br_{2}]_{2}[Te_{2}Br_{10}]	triclinic	P1̅	a=10.1638 b=11.0241 c=12.5200 α =85.461 β =85.529 γ =76.410°; Z =1	1358.94	4.631		
	NbOTe_{7}Br_{5}							
decasilver tetratelluride tribromide	Ag_{10}Te_{4}Br_{3}	hexagonal *2 orthorhombic*2	P6/mmm P6_{3}/mmc Cmc2_{1}				Ag^{+} conductor	
	Ag_{10}Te_{4}Br_{3}	orthorhombic	Cmcm	a=15.381 b=15.765 c=13.726	3328.2		Ag ion conductor	
	Ag_{23}Te_{12}Br	orthorhombic	Pnnm				honeycomb Te; Ag ion conductor	
	Ag_{19}Te_{6}Br_{7}	trigonal monoclinic	R3̅m					
	Ag_{19}Te_{6}Br_{5.4}I_{1.6}	orthorhombic	Pnma				electric conductor	
	Ag_{19}Te_{5}SeBr_{7}	orthorhombic	Pbam					
	La_{3}Te_{4}Br	orthorhombic	Pnma	a = 16.343 b = 4.350 c = 14.266 Z = 4	1014.1			
	W_{2}O_{2}Te_{4}Br_{5}							
	Re_{4}Te_{8}Br_{16}		I4̅	a=11.202 c=13.935	1748.6			
	[Re_{2}Br_{4}(Te_{2})(TeBr)_{2}(TeBr_{2})_{2}]							
	[Re_{6}Te_{8}(TeBr_{2})_{6}]Br_{2}							
	Pd_{4}Br_{4}Te_{3}	triclinic	P1̅	a =8.425 b =8.450 c =8.648; α =82.55 β =73.36 γ =88.80°; Z =2			semiconductor	
	AuBrTe_{2}	orthorhombic		a=4.033 b=12.375 c=8.942		7.89	silvery white, metallic melt 457 C	
	Hg_{3}Te_{2}Br_{2}						yellow	
	Hg_{3}Te_{2}BrI	monoclinic	C2	18.376 b=9.587 c=10.575 β=100.11°				
	Tl_{5}Te_{2}Br							
	BiTeBr	trigonal	P3̅m1	a = 4.2662 c = 6.487			melt 526	
	Bi_{2}Te_{2}BrAlCl_{4}	monoclinic	C2/c					
