= Selenide iodide =

Class of chemical compounds

The selenide iodides are chemical compounds that contain both selenide ions (Se^{2−}) and iodide ions (I^{−}) and one or metal atoms. They are in the class of mixed anion compounds or chalcogenide halides.

Some related compounds do not actually contain a selenide ion, instead containing an iodoselenium cation. These cations include SeI_{3}^{+}, Se_{2}I_{4}^{2+}, Se_{6}I_{2}^{2+}, and polymeric Se_{6}I^{+}.

== List ==
| name | formula | MW | system | space group | unit cell | cell volume | density | properties | ref |
|---|---|---|---|---|---|---|---|---|---|
| | Ti_{4}Se_{9}I_{6} | | triclinic | P1̅ | a = 7.965 b = 10.339 c = 15.692; α = 79.116°, β = 75.861°, γ = 71.437°; Z = 2 | | | black | |
| | V_{4}O(Se_{2})_{4}I_{6}·I_{2} | 1866.64 | tetragonal | P4_{2}/nbc | a=11.8384 c=18.689 Z=4 | 2619.2 | 4.734 | dark blue | |
| | CuSe_{3}I | | trigonal | R3̅m | a=9.601 V= 872.859 | | | | |
| α | AsSeI | | monoclinic | P2_{s} | a=8.855 b=4.194 c=10.341 β=93.74 Z=4 | | 5.14 | melt 221 °C dark red metallic | |
| β | AsSeI | | cubic | F4_{1}32 | a=11.05 Z=16 | | 5.53 | dark red metallic | |
| | AsF_{6}Se_{6}I | | | | | | | | |
| | NbSe_{2}I_{2} | | triclinic | P1̅ | a=6.993 b=7.008 c=7.768 α=89.339° β=66.801° γ=61.284° Z=2 | 299.3 | 5.600 | black; 2D; band gap 1 eV | |
| triniobium selenide heptaiodide | Nb_{3}SeI_{7} | | hexagonal | P6_{3}mc | | | | | |
| | (Nb_{4}Se_{15}I_{2})I_{2} | | monoclinic | P2_{1}/c | a=8.8807 b=25.8368 c=11.6222 β=103.437° | | | black; 1D; band gap 0.6 eV | |
| | [Mo_{3}Se_{7}(TeI_{3})I_{2}]I | 1729.54 | | P2_{3}/n | a=10.4969 b=13.029 c=16.567 β =102.921° Z=4 | 2208.3 | 5.202 | | |
| | Pd_{2}SeI_{3} | | orthorhombic | | | | | metallic black | |
| heptasilver(I) tetraseleniogermanate(IV) selenide iodide | Ag_{7}GeISe_{5} | | cubic | F4̅3m | a=10.9864 Z=4 | 1326.1 | 6.740 | black; silver ion conductor | |
| | CdBiSe_{2}I | | monoclinic | C2/m | | | | | |
| indium selenide iodide | InSeI | | tetragonal | I4_{1}/a | | | | | |
| Antimony selenide iodide | SbSeI | | orthorhombic | Pnma | | | | band gap 1.70 eV n-type semiconductor | |
| | SbF_{6}Se_{6}I | | | | | | | | |
| | Cs_{3}Mo_{6}I_{6}Se_{2}I_{6} | | | | | | | | |
| | Cs_{3}Mo_{6}I_{7}SeI_{6} | | | | | | | | |
| tribarium tetraselenide diiodide | Ba_{3}Se_{4}I_{2} | | monoclinic | C2/c | a = 15.080 Å, b = 10.400 Å, c = 8.383 Å, β = 103.206°, Z = 4 | | | | |
| | Ta_{2}Se_{8}I | | tetragonal | | a = 9.59 c = 12.64 | | | Charge-density-wave Weyl semimetal | |
| tritantalum selenide heptaiodide | Ta_{3}SeI_{7} | | hexagonal | P6_{3}mc | | | | | |
| | Ta_{4}Se_{9}I_{8} | | | | | | | | |
| | WCl_{6}Se_{6}I | | | | | | | | |
| | Hg_{3}Se_{2}I_{2} | | orthorhombic | Imma | a= 9.7660 b=19.381 c=9.6332 Z=8 | | | light red | |
| trimercury arsenic tetraselenide iodide | Hg_{3}AsSe_{4}I | 1119.43 | hexagonal | P6_{3}mc | a = 7.6902 c = 9.968 Z = 2 | 510.50 | 7.283 | dark red | |
| | Tl_{6}SeI_{4} | | tetragonal | P4/mnc | | | 7.4 | band-gap 1.6 eV; semiconductor; melt 432 °C | |
| Bismuth selenide iodide | BiSeI | 414.84 | orthorhombic | Pnma | a = 8.697 b = 4.2205 c = 10.574 | 388.1 | 7.100 | band gap 1.3 eV; silver | |
| | Bi_{2}CuSe_{3}I | | | | | | | | |
| | In_{2}Bi_{3}Se_{7}I | | | | | | | | |
| | InBi_{2}Se_{4}I | | | | | | | | |
