= Silicide hydride =

A silicide hydride is a mixed anion compound that contains silicide (Si^{4−} or clusters) and hydride (H^{−}) anions. The hydrogen is not bound to silicon in these compounds. These can be classed as interstitial hydrides, Hydrogenated zintl phases, or Zintl phase hydrides. In the related silanides, SiH_{3}^{−} anions or groups occur. Where hydrogen is bonded to the silicon, this is a case of anionic hydride, and where it is bonded to a more complex anion, it would be termed polyanionic hydride.

Silicide hydrides may be prepared by heating a Zintl phase or metal silicide under hydrogen pressure, of perhaps 20 atmospheres.

== Properties ==
In CaSiD_{1+x} the deuterium atom (D) fits in a tetrahedral hole between three calcium and one silicon atoms. The Si-D distance is 1.82 Å, quite a bit further than then a Si-H covalent bond.

== List ==
formula	system	space group	unit cell Å	volume	density	comment	reference
Li_{4}Si_{2}H	orthorhombic	Cmmm				zigzag Si chains Si-Si 2.39	
CaSiH							
CaSiH_{1+x} x<1.2	orthorhombic	Pnma	a = 14.4884, b = 3.8247, c = 11.2509, Z = 3			zigzag Si chains Si-Si 2.47	
CaAlSiH	trigonal		Z=1			Al-H bond semimetal	
Ca_{2}SiH_{2.41}	amorphous		a=5.969 b=3.6146 c=6.815			reversible hydrogen storage	
Ca_{5}Si_{3}H_{0.53}	tetrahedral	I4/mcm	a=7.6394 c=14.7935 Z=4	863.33			
SrSiH_{1.6}	orthorhombic	Pnma					
SrAlSiH		P3m1				Al-H bond semimetal	
SrGaSiH	trigonal	P3m1	Z=1			grey; Ga-H 1.71 semimetal	
Sr_{21}Si_{2}O_{5}H_{21+x}	cubic	Fd3̅m	a = 19.1190				
BaSiH_{3.4}	orthorhombic	Pnma					
Ba_{3}Si_{4}H_{x} (x = 1–2)	tetrahedral	I4/mcm	a ≈ 8.44, c ≈ 11.95, Z = 8			Si_{4}^{6–} in a butterfly-shape	
Ba_{21}Si_{2}O_{5}H_{21+x}	cubic	Fd3̅m	a = 20.336				
BaAlSiH						Al-H bond semimetal	
BaGaSiH	trigonal	P3m1	a=4.2934 c=5.186 Z=1	82.79		grey; air stable; Ga-H 1.71 semimetal	
BaGaSiD	trigonal	P3m1	a=4.2776 c=5.1948 Z=1	82.32		grey	
LaFeSiH	tetragonal	P4/nmm	a=4.0270 c=8.0374				
LaFeSiH	orthorhombic	Cmme	a=5.6831 b=5.7037 c=7.9728			at 15K; superconductor Tc=9.7K	
La_{3}Pd_{5}SiD_{~1.6}	orthorhombic	Imma	a=13.193 b=7.638 c=7.916	801.8		<9.5 bar	
La_{3}Pd_{5}SiD_{~2.71}	orthorhombic	Imma	a=13.102 b=7.673 c=8.168	821.3			
La_{3}Pd_{5}SiD_{~5}	orthorhombic	Pmnb	a=13.16 b=7.91 c=8.20	854		>75 bar	
BaLaSi_{2}D_{0.80}	orthorhombic	Cmcm	a = 4.6443, b = 15.267, c = 6.7630				
NdScSiH_{1.5}	tetrahedral	I4/mmm	a=4.221 c=16.928 Z=4				
EuSiH_{1.8}	orthorhombic	Pnma					
GdMnSiH	tetragonal	P4/nmm					
GdFeSiH	tetragonal	P4/nmm	a=3.901 c=7.503	114.2			
GdCoSiH	tetragonal	P4/nmm	a=3.879 c=7.439	111.9			
