= Nitride chloride =

Class of chemical compounds

A chloride nitride is a mixed anion compound containing both chloride (Cl^{−}) and nitride ions (N^{3−}). Another name is metallochloronitrides. They are a subclass of halide nitrides or pnictide halides.

The group 4 element chloride nitrides can be intercalated by alkali metals that supply extra electrons, and other molecules such as from solvents like tetrahydrofuran, yielding layered substances that are superconductors. A superconductor transition temperature T_{c} of 25.5K has been achieved.

== Production ==
Nitride chlorides may be produced by heating metal nitrides with metal chlorides. The ammonolysis process heats a metal chloride with ammonia. A related method heats a metal or metal hydride with ammonium chloride. The nitrogen source could also be an azide or an amide.

== List ==
name	formula	formula weight	crystal system	space group	unit cell Å	volume	density	comments	ref
	Li_{4}NCl		hexagonal	R3	a=366.225 c=1977.18 Z=3				
	Li_{1.8}N_{0.4}Cl_{0.6}							Li ion conductor	
Cyanogen chloride	ClCN							molecular	
Magnesium nitride chloride	Mg_{2}NCl		hexagonal	R3̅m	a = 3.2994 c = 17.857				
phosphonitrilic chloride cyclic trimer	P_{3}N_{3}Cl_{6}							molecular	
trithiazyl trichloride	S_{3}N_{3}Cl_{3}							cas 5964-00-1	
	Ca_{2}NCl		hexagonal	R3̅m	a 3.6665 c 19.7187				
	Sc_{2}Cl_{2}N			P3̅m1	a = 3:517 c = 8.813			layered	
	Sc_{4}Cl_{6}N		orthorhombic	Pbam	a = 11.625, b = 12.118, c = 3.5447				
	Sc_{5}Cl_{8}N			C2/m	a = 17.85, b = 3.5505, c = 12.090, β = 130.13				
	Sc_{7}Cl_{12}N			R3	a = 12.990, c = 8.835			Sc_{6}N clusters	
Titanium nitride chloride	TiNCl		orthorhombic	Pmmn	a=3.275 b=3.967 c=8.402 a = 3.937, b = 3.258, c = 7.803	109.2		black	
	Li0.6TiNCl								
	Cl_{3}VNCl		triclinic	P1̅	a = 7.64, b = 7.14, c = 5.91, α = 94.9, β = 112.4, γ = 107.8			V=NCl complex	
	Zn_{2}NCl	180.20	orthorhombic	Pna2_{1}	a=6.137 b=7.394 c=5.940 Z=4	269.5	4.441	band gap 3.21 eV	
	Zn_{2}NCl		orthorhombic	Pnma	Z=16			predicted	
	Zn_{2}NCl		hexagonal	R3̅m				predicted	
	Sr_{2}BN_{2}Cl								
	α-Y_{2}Cl_{3}N		orthorhombic	Pbcn	a = 12.761, b = 6.676, c = 6.1000				
	β-Y_{2}Cl_{3}N			C2/m	a = 15.248, b = 3.8520, c = 10.157, β = 118.41				
	α-ZrNCl		orthorhombic	Pmmn	a = 3.937, b = 3.258, c = 7.803			pale yellow-green	
β-zirconium nitride chloride	β-ZrNCl		hexagonal	R3̅m	a = 3.6031, c = 27.672			yellow-green;semiconductor; layers of Cl–Zr–N–N–Zr–Cl	
	Zr_{6}Cl_{15}N		cubic	Ia3d	a = 21.171				
Lithium-intercalated β-zirconium nitride chloride	Li_{x}ZrNCl							black; superconductor T_{c}=12.5 K	
	Na_{x}ZrNCl							superconductor T_{c} 15 K	
	K_{x}ZrNCl							superconductor T_{c} 15 K	
molybdenum nitride chloride	MoNCl_{3}		triclinic	P1̅	a = 9.14, b = 7.67, c = 8.15, α = 108.8, β = 99.3, γ= 108.6				
	Mo_{2}NCl_{7}		triclinic	P1̅	a = 9.057, b = 9.754, c = 12.834, α = 103.13, β = 109.83, γ = 98.58				
	Mo_{2}NCl_{8}		monoclinic	P2/c	a = 9.961, b = 6.294, c = 17.808, β = 101.82				
Phenyldiazonium tetrachloronitridomolybdate	C_{6}H_{5}N_{2}[MoNCl_{4}]		monoclinic	P2_{1}/c	a = 12.83, b = 11.70, c = 19.22 β = 94.11 Z=2			dark red	
Technetium chloride nitride	TcCl_{3}N							black; cas 154525-32-3	
	(Ph_{4}As)[TcNCl_{4}]								
	[Se_{3}N_{2}Cl]^{+}SbCl_{6}^{−}		triclinic	P1	a=6.982 b=6.997 c=15.105 α = 89.45°, β = 86.18°, γ = 68.22° Z=2			red	
	Ba_{2}NCl		hexagonal	R3̅m					
	Ba_{3}Si_{3}N_{5}OCl			P6̅2c	a=9.560 c=5.552				
	Ba_{25}Nb_{5}N_{19}Cl_{18}								
	LiBa_{4}[Mo_{2}N_{7}]BaCl_{2}								
	La_{2}NCl_{3}		orthorhombic	Ibam	a = 13.758, b = 6.922, c = 6.185				
	La_{2}Cl(CN_{2})N		orthorhombic	Cmmm	a = 13.340, b = 9.5267, c = 3.9402, Z=4				
	La_{6}N_{3}S_{4}Cl		orthorhombic	Pnma	a = 11.597; b = 4.1095; c = 27.568 Z=4				
	CeNCl		tetragonal	P4/nmm	a=4.079 c=6.837 Z=			black	
Cerium(III) nitride chloride	Ce_{2}NCl_{3}		orthorhombic	Ibam	a = 13.6021 b=6.8903 c= 6.1396 Z=4	575.42	4.624	Light yellow	
	Ce_{2}Cl(CN_{2})N		orthorhombic	Cmmm	a = 13.3914, b = 9.6345, c = 3.9568, Z=4				
	Ce_{6}Cl_{12}N_{2}	1294.1	monoclinic	P2_{1}/c	a=11.233 b=16.527 c=10.798 β =90.15 Z=4	1988	4.324	yellow	
	Na_{2}[{(ON)Ce_{4}}Cl_{9}]		monoclinic	P2_{1}/m	a = 8.1321, b = 11.4613, c = 9.4286 and β = 107.504° Z=2				
	Pr_{2}NCl_{3}		orthorhombic	Ibam	a = 13.531, b = 6.8512, c = 6.1072				
	Pr_{5}N_{3}S_{2}Cl_{2}		monoclinic	C2/m	a = 15.402; b = 4.0092; c = 16.563; β = 101.24°, Z = 4				
	Pr_{6}N_{3}S_{4}Cl		orthorhombic	Pnma	a=11.3987 b=4.0235 c=26.999 Z=4	1238.3		reddish-brown	
	Nd_{2}NCl_{3}		orthorhombic	Pbcn	a = 13.382, b = 6.8462, c = 6.1815				
	Nd_{3}NCl_{6}		orthorhombic	Pbca	a = 10.4971, b = 11.0683, c = 16.211; Z = 8				
	Nd_{4}NS_{3}Cl_{3}		hexagonal	P6_{3}mc	a = 9.2278, c = 6.8306; Z = 2				
	Nd_{6}N_{3}S_{4}Cl		orthorhombic	Pnma	a = 11.371; b = 3.9934; c = 26.876				
	Na_{2}Nd_{4}ONCl_{9}		monoclinic	P2_{1}/m	a = 8.0354, b = 11.3426, c = 9.2831 and β = 107.109°				
Trigadolinium hexachloride nitride	Gd_{3}Cl_{6}N	698.485	triclinic	P1̅	a = 7.107, b = 8.156, c = 9.707, α = 75.37°, β = 109.10°, γ = 114.64° Z=2	478.8	4.84	colourless; water sensitive; biaxial (−)	
	Gd_{2}NCl_{3}		orthorhombic	Pbcn	a=13.017 b=6.7310 c=6.1403				
	Gd_{2}N_{2}Cl		tetragonal	P4mm	a = 4.25 c = 5.92				
	α-HfNCl		orthorhombic	Pmmn	a = 4.130, b = 3.497, c = 8.070				
	β-HfNCl		hexagonal	R3̅m	a = 3.5744, c = 27.7075			colourless	
	Na_{x}HfNCl							superconductor T_{c} 25 K	
	Ba_{3}Ta_{3}N_{6}Cl			P6̅2c	a =10.1455 c =5.9770				
	Ba_{3}Cl_{2}TaN_{3}		hexagonal	P6_{3}cm	a = 15.0739, c = 6.3298; Z = 6			light yellow	
	Ba_{15}Ta_{15}N_{33}Cl_{4}			P6̅2c	a =10.1545 c =29.917				
	W_{2}NCl_{8}		triclinic	P1̅	a = 6.2423, b = 6.309, c = 6.931, α = 89.76, β = 81.51, γ = 82.68				
	W_{2}NCl_{9}			P2_{1}/c	a = 8.421, b = 16.786, c = 11.930, β = 134.74°				
	[WNCl_{3} • POCl_{3}]_{4} • 2 POCl_{3}		triclinic	P1̅	a = 12.257 b = 11.851 c = 19.27.0 α = 102.6° β= 108.4° γ = 94.8° Z=2				
	Ba_{4}[WN_{4}]Cl_{2}								
	ReNCl_{4}		tetragonal	I4	a=8.278 b=8.281 c=4.057 Z=2			brown	
	ReNCl_{4}·H_{2}O		orthorhombic	Pnma	a = 10.754, b = 11.085, c = 547.7 Z=4			red	
	[NBu_{4}][ReNCl_{4}]		orthorhombic	P4/n	a 11.795 b 11.795 c 8.466			ReN triple bond in complex	
	K_{2}OsNCl_{5}		orthorhombic	Pnma	a = 13.27, b = 9.85, c = 6.84				
Kleinite	Hg2N(Cl,SO4)•n(H2O)		hexagonal	C6_{3}/mmc	a = 13.56 c = 11.13 Z = 18	1,772.33	8.01	yellow	
Mosesite	Hg2N(Cl,SO4,MoO4,CO3)•(H2O)		cubic	F4̅3m	a = 9.524, Z = 8	863.89	7.71	yellow; refractive index 2.065	
	ThNCl		tetragonal	P4/nmm	a =4.09486 c =6.9013				
Uranium nitride chloride	UNCl		tetragonal	P4/nmm	a=3.97 c=6.81 Z=2				
