= Telluride phosphide =

Class of chemical compounds

The telluride phosphides are a class of mixed anion compounds containing both telluride and phosphide ions (Te^{2−} P^{3−}). The phosphidotelluride or telluridophosphide compounds have a [TeP]^{3−} group in which the tellurium atom has a bond to the phosphorus atom. A formal charge of −2 is on the phosphorus and −1 on the tellurium. There is no binary compound of tellurium and phosphorus. Not many telluride phosphides are known, but they have been discovered for noble metals, actinides, and group 4 elements.

== Structure ==
The titanium group elements form layered hexagonal crystals that can be exfoliated to monolayers. These contain ditelluride Te_{2}^{2-} units. These layered compounds can be intercalated to form non-stoichiometric compounds with zinc, copper or cadmium by heating with the metals. Actinide telluride phosphides contain diphosphide anions P_{2}.

== List ==
name	formula	MW	ratio Te:P	system	space group	unit cell Å	volume	density	optical	band gap		CAS	references
	P_{4}S_{2}Te			molecular									
	P_{4}STe_{2}			molecular									
	Ti_{2}PTe_{2}			hexagonal	R3̅m	a=3.6387 c=28.486			metallic	on c axis	also monolayer		
	Mn_{x}Ti_{2}PTe_{2}				R3̅m1	a=3.648 c=9.628							
	Fe_{x}Ti_{2}PTe_{2}				R3̅m1	a=3.6356 c=9.639							
	Cu_{0.282}Ti_{2}PTe_{2}				R3̅m1	a=3.6726 c=9.7822							
	Zn_{0.36}Ti_{2}PTe_{2}				R3̅m1	a=3.6917 c=9.8480							
	Cd_{x}Ti_{2}PTe_{2}				R3̅m1	a=3.6806 c=10.238							
	Zr_{2}PTe_{2}			rhombohedral	R3̅m	a=3.8117 c=29.189 Z=3	367.27	6.356	black		also monolayer		
	Cu_{x}Zr_{2}PTe_{2}				R3̅m1	a=3.8445 c=10.1082							
	Zn_{0.337}Zr_{2}PTe_{2}				R3̅m1	a=3.85873 c=10.1664							
	Cd_{0.194}Zr_{2}PTe_{2}				R3̅m1	a=3.8469 c=10.4197							
	RuTeP												
	BaP_{4}Te			orthorhombic	Pnma with	a =16.486 b =6.484 c =7.076 Z =4							
	CeP_{0.4}Te_{1.6}												
	CeP_{1.1}Te_{0.9}												
cerium phosphide telluride	Ce_{3}Te_{3}P		3:1										
	Hf_{2}Te_{2}P				R3̅m	a=3.7946 c=29.14					also monolayer		
	IrTeP			orthorhombic		a=6.030 b=6.131 c=12.132							
	OsTeP		1:1	arsenopyrite structure	P2_{1}/c	a = 6.2291 b = 6.1604 c = 6.2449 β = 112.01°	222.2	10.43					
	ThPTe		1:1	tetragonal		a = 4.2505 and c = 17.268							
	UPTe			tetragonal		a=4.100 c=17.026							
	U_{2}PTe_{2}O			pseudo tetragonal		a = 40.37c = 32.07							
	NpPTe			tetragonal	P4/nmm	a=4.265 c=9.067							
	PuPTe			tetragonal	P4/nmm	a=4.289 c=9.098							
	AmPTe			tetragonal	P4/nmm	a=4.269 c=9.050							
