= Oxyselenide =

Class of chemical compounds

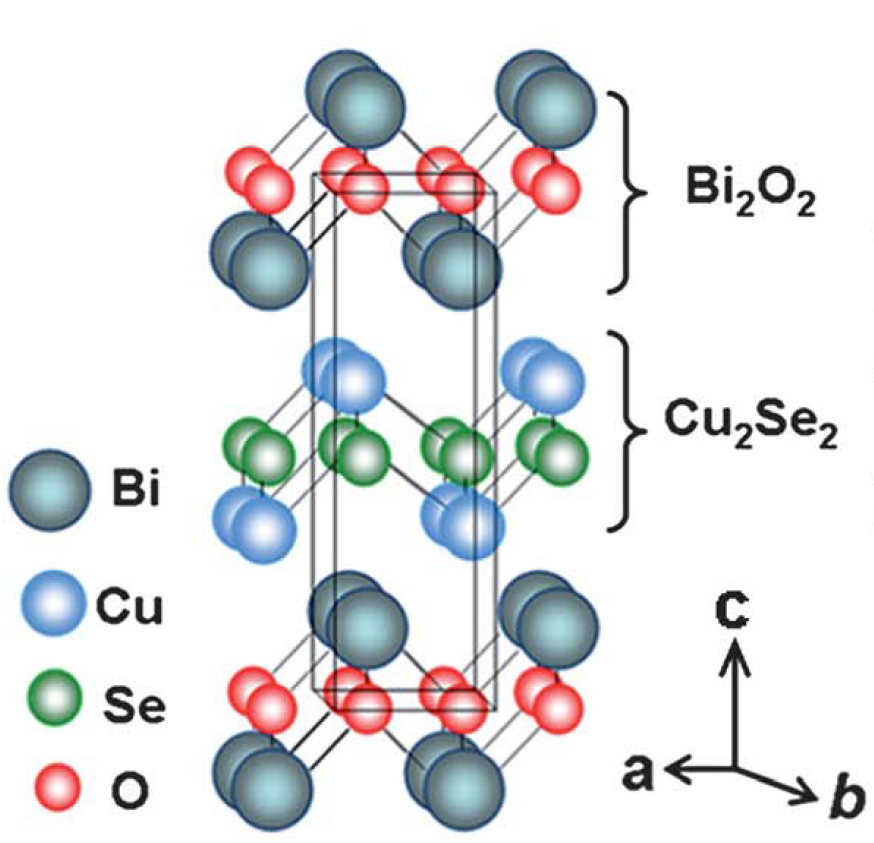
Figure 1: Crystal structure of the BiCuSeO with a layered ZrSiCuAs structure

Oxyselenides are a group of chemical compounds that contain oxygen and selenium atoms (Figure 1). Oxyselenides can form a wide range of structures in compounds containing various transition metals, and thus can exhibit a wide range of properties. Most importantly, oxyselenides have a wide range of thermal conductivity, which can be controlled with changes in temperature in order to adjust their thermoelectric performance. Current research on oxyselenides indicates their potential for significant application in electronic materials.

== Synthesis ==
The first oxyselenide to be crystallized was manganese oxyselenide in 1900. In 1910, oxyselenides containing phosphate were created by treating P_{2}Se_{5} with metal hydroxides. Uranium oxyselenide was formed next by treating H_{2}Se with uranium dioxides at 1000 °C. This technique was also utilized in synthesizing oxyselenides of rare-earth elements in the mid-1900s. Synthesis of oxyselenide compounds currently involves treating oxides with aluminum powder and selenium at high temperatures.

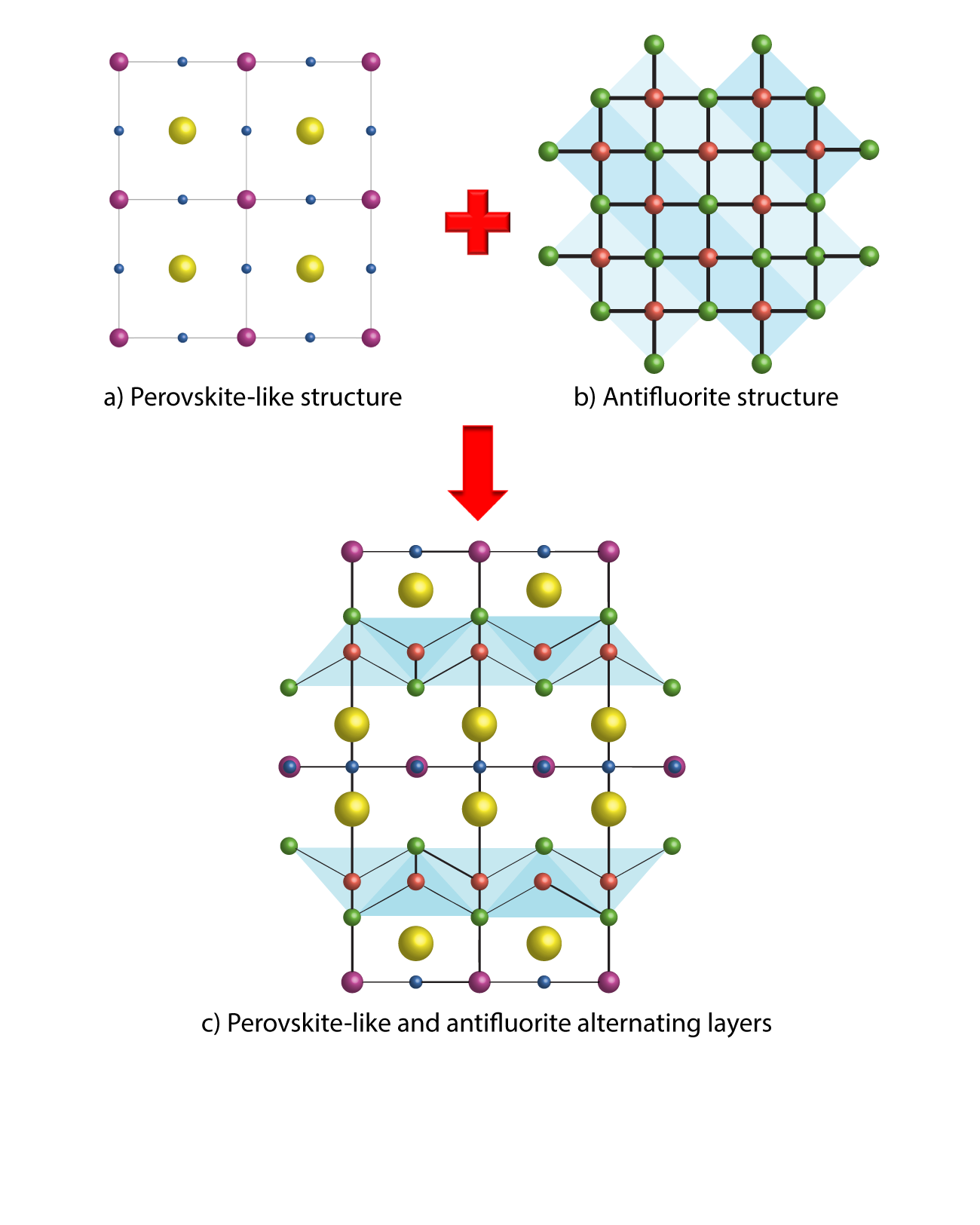
Figure 2: Some recently discovered oxyselenide structures crystallize in such a way that the metal oxide layers (a) and the metal selenide layers (b) form an alternating pattern (c). Color code: yellow − strontium; pink − cobalt; blue − oxygen; green − selenium; orange − copper

Recent discoveries in iron oxyarsenides and their superconductivity have highlighted the importance of mixed anion systems. Mixed copper oxychalcogenides came about when the electronic properties of both chalcogenides and oxides were taken into account. Chemists began pursuing the synthesis of a compound with metallic and charge density wave properties as well as high temperature superconductivity. Upon synthesizing the copper oxyselenide Na_{1.9}Cu_{2}Se_{2}·Cu_{2}O by reacting Na_{2}Se_{3.6} with Cu_{2}O, they concluded that a new type of oxychalcogenides could be synthesized by reacting metal oxides with polychalcogenide fluxes.

== Derivatives ==
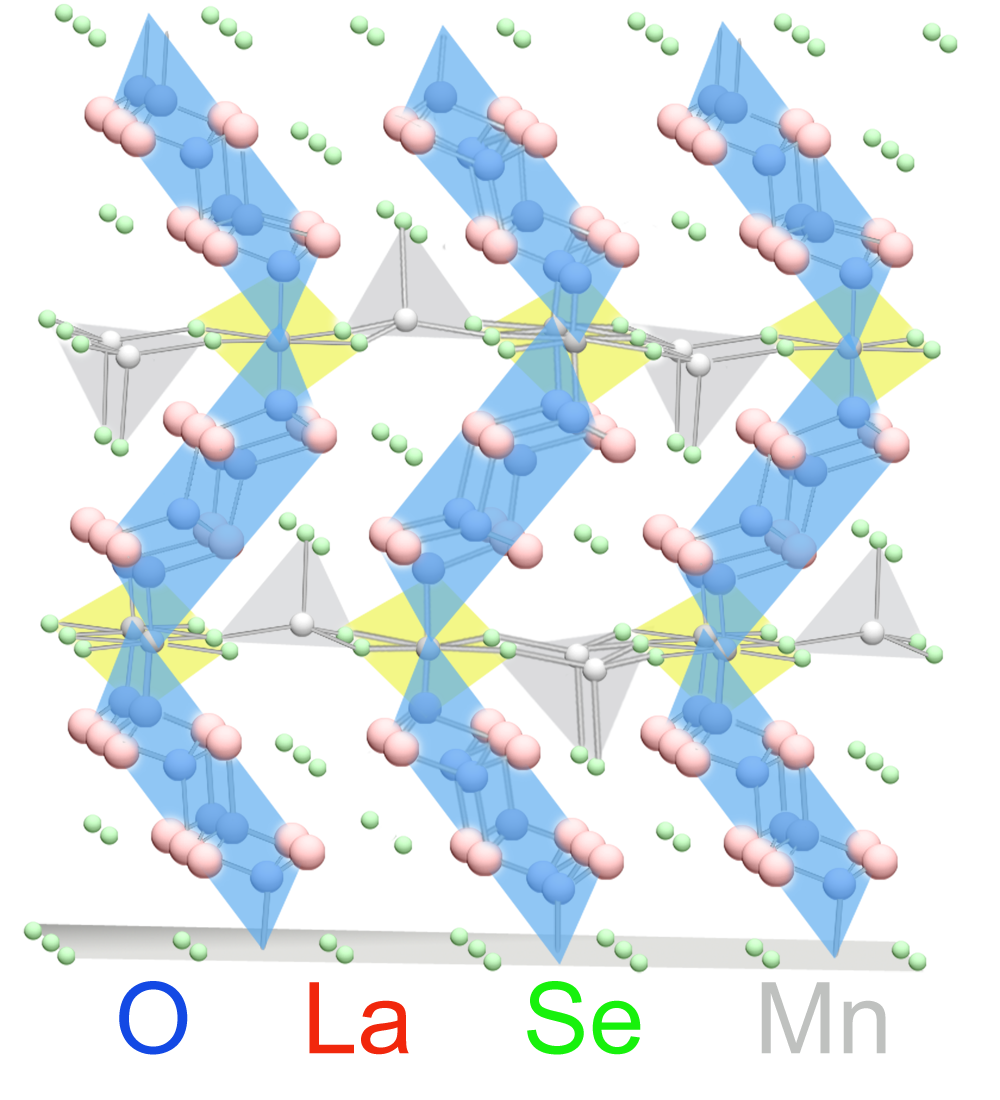
Figure 3: Orthorhombic structure of β-La_{2}O_{2}MnSe_{2} at low temperatures.

New oxyselenides of the formula Sr_{2}AO_{2}M_{2}Se_{2} (A=Co, Mn; M=Cu, Ag) have been synthesized. They crystallize into structures consisting of alternating perovskite-like (metal oxide) and antifluorite (metal selenide) layers (Figure 2). The optical band gap of each oxyselenide is very narrow, indicating semiconductivity.

Another derivative that reveals oxyselenide properties is β-La_{2}O_{2}MSe_{2} (M= Fe, Mn). This molecule possesses an orthorhombic structure (Figure 3), opening up the possibilities for different packing arrangements of oxyselenides. They are ferromagnetic at low temperatures (~27 K) and show high resistivity at room temperature. The Mn analogue, diluted in NaCl solution, suggests an optical band gap of 1.6 eV at room temperature, making it an insulator. Meanwhile, the band gap for the Fe analogue is approximately 0.7 eV between 150 K and 300 K, making it a semiconductor. In contrast, cobalt oxyselenide La_{2}Co_{2}O_{3}Se_{2} is antiferromagnetically ordered, suggesting that although the different transition metals are responsible for the changes in an oxyselenide's magnetic property, the molecule's overall lattice structure may also influence its conductivity.

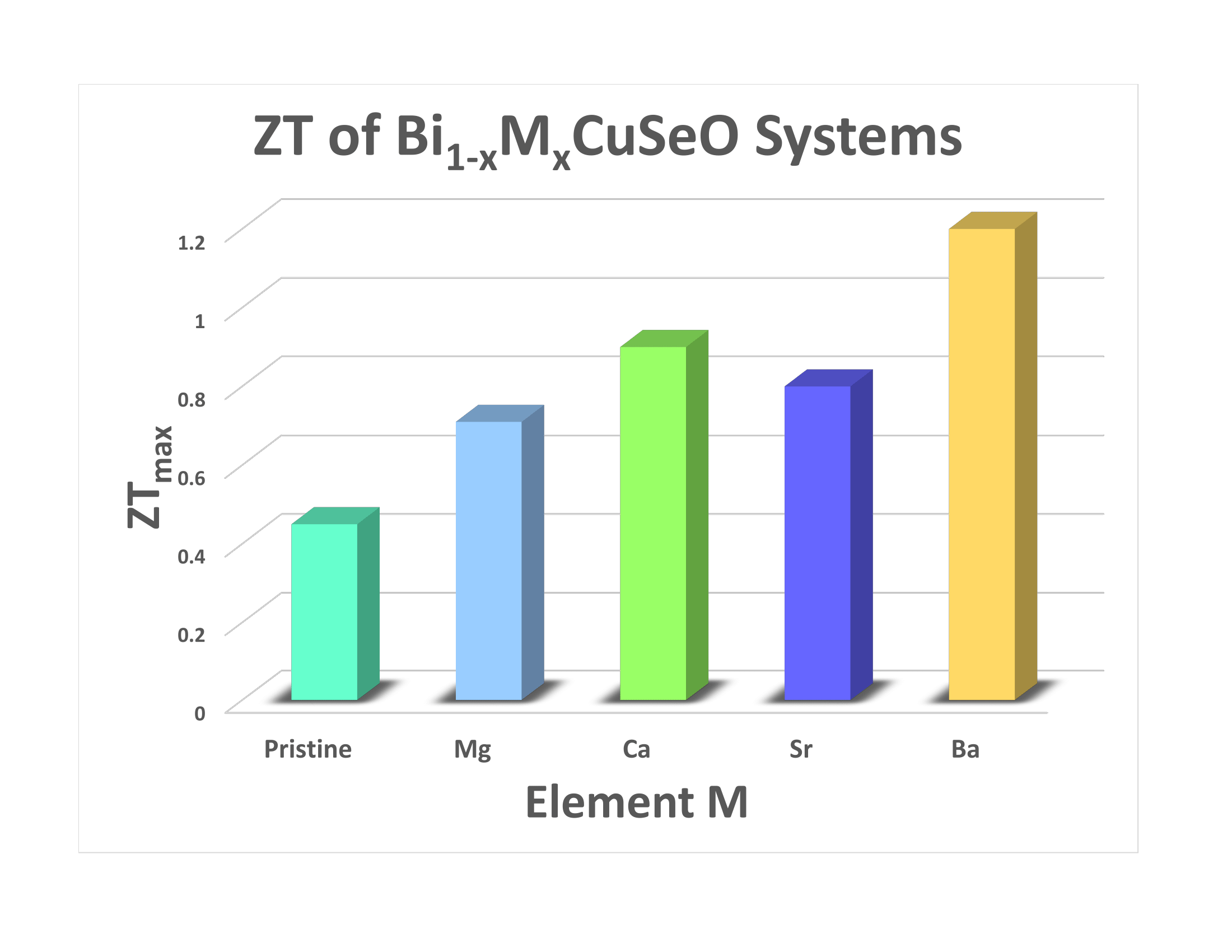
Figure 4: Comparison of figure-of-merit ZT compounds Bi1-xMxCuSeO. Higher ZTs indicate more efficient energy conversions.

The magnetic and conducting properties of different metal compounds coordinated with oxyselenide are not only affected by the transition metal used, but also by the synthesis conditions. For example, the percentage of aluminium used during the synthesis of Ce_{2}O_{2}ZnSe_{2} as an oxygen retriever affected the band gaps, indicated by the varying product colours. Various structures allow for many potential configurations. For example, as observed before in La_{2}Co_{2}O_{3}Se_{2}, Sr_{2}F_{2}Mn_{2}Se_{2}O exhibits a frustrated magnetic correlation in the structure resulting in an antiferromagnetic lattice.

In 2010, p-type polycrystalline BiCuSeO oxyselenides were reported as possible thermoelectric materials. The weak bonds between the [Cu_{2}Se_{2}]^{−2} conducting and [Bi_{2}O_{2}]^{+2} insulating layer, as well as the anharmonic crystal lattice structure, may account for the substance's low thermal conductivity and high thermoelectric performance. Recently, BiCuSeO's ZT value, a dimensionless figure-of-merit indicating thermoelectric performance, has been increased from 0.5 to 1.4. Experiment has shown that Ca doping can improve electrical conductivity, thereby increasing the ZT value. Additionally, replacing 15% of the Bi^{3+} ions with group 2 metal ions, Ca^{2+}, Sr^{2+}, or Ba^{2+} (Figure 4), also optimizes the charge carrier concentration.
