= Antimonide silicide =

Class of chemical compounds

Antimonide silicides are mixed anion compounds containing metal cations, and antimonide (Sb^{−3}) and silicide (Si^{−4}) anions. In some compounds, there are covalent bonds between silicon atoms, and the apparent valency is reduced.

== List ==
formula	crystal system	space group	unit cell	volume	density	comment	reference
Ti_{5}Si_{1.3}Sb_{1.7}	tetragonal	I4/mcm	a = 10.346, c = 5.152 Z=8			metallic conductor	
V_{4}SiSb_{2}	tetragonal	I4/mcm	a = 9.872, c = 4.707, Z = 4			V^{+2} Si^{−2} Sb^{−3}	
ZrSb_{1.93}Si_{0.06}	orthorhombic	Pnma	a=7.401 b=3.9898 c=9.610 Z=4	283.8	7.692		
Zr_{5}Sb_{3}Si	hexagonal	P6_{3}/mcm	a=8.5409 c=5.8248 Z=2				
Y_{5}Sb_{2}Si_{2}	orthorhombic	Cmca					
ZrSi_{0.7}Sb_{1.3}							
NbSiSb	tetragonal	P4/nmm	a=3.67 c=8.25				
Nb_{4}SiSb_{2}	tetragonal	I4/mcm	a = 10.3638 c = 4.9151 Z = 4	527.92	8.093		
Nb_{3}Sb_{0.55}Si_{0.45}						Cr_{3}Si structure	
Nb_{3}Si_{0.6}Sb_{0.4}						Ti_{3}P structure	
NbSi_{1.65}Sb_{0.35}						CrSi_{2} structure	
Nb_{4}Cu_{0.2}SiSb_{2}	tetragonal	I4/mcm	a=10.3954 c=4.9233 Z=4	532.03	8.189		
Nb_{4}Pd_{0.2}SiSb_{2}	tetragonal	I4/mcm	a=10.3991 c=4.9362 Z=4	533.81	8.268		
Tb_{5}Sb_{2}Si_{2}	orthorhombic	Cmca					
Dy_{5}Sb_{2}Si_{2}	orthorhombic	Cmca					
Ho_{5}Sb_{2}Si_{2}	orthorhombic	Cmca					
Er_{5}Sb_{2}Si_{2}	orthorhombic	Cmca					
Tm_{5}Sb_{2}Si_{2}	orthorhombic	Cmca	a=14.768 b=7.723 c=7.741				
PtSiSb	orthorhombic	Pbca	a=6.3128 b=6.3347 c=11.394 Z=8 a=6.3156 b=6.33931 c=11.4008	456.449	10.03	semiconductor; Si-Si bonds	
Pt_{5}SiSb							
Nb_{4}Pt_{0.14}SiSb_{2}	tetragonal	I4/mcm	a=10.3803 c=4.9348 Z=4	531.73	8.376		
