= Oxynitride =

Class of chemical compounds

The oxynitrides are a group of inorganic compounds containing oxygen and nitrogen not bound to each other, instead combined with other non-metallic or metallic elements. Some of these are oxosalts with oxygen replaced by nitrogen. Some of these compounds do not have a fixed oxygen to nitrogen ratio, but instead form ceramics with a range of compositions. They are in the class of mixed anion compounds.

Many can be formed by heating an oxide or carbonate with ammonia. The hydrogen can assist by reducing some of the oxygen. With higher temperatures and pressures nitrogen can be heated with a mixed oxide to yield a product. Other nitrogen rich compounds that can be heated with oxygen containing material are urea and melamine. For example urea heated with ammonium dihydrogen phosphate yields a phosphorus oxynitride.

There may not be a definite ratio of nitrogen to oxygen, and also nitrogen and oxygen may be disordered, swapping places at random.

Compared to oxides, the oxynitrides have a smaller band gap.

== List ==
name	other name	formula	properties	reference
aluminium oxynitride	ALON		transparent, tough	
Lithium silicon oxynitride	LiSiON		Pca2_{1} Wurtzite structure a=5.1986 b=6.3893 c=4.7398	
	SiAlON	SiAlNO (Li,Mg,Y,Le,Ce,Eu)		
Silicon oxynitride				
sodium silicon oxynitride		NaSiON	white Wurtzite structure	
Sinoite		Si_{2}N_{2}O	mineral	
		Li_{14}Cr_{2}N_{8}O	P3̅ a=5.799 c=8.263	
		NaGeON	white Wurtzite structure	
potassium germanium oxynitride		KGeON	yellow Wurtzite structure a=5.7376 b=8.0535 c=5.2173	
		(Si,Ge)_{2}N_{2}O		
tantalum oxynitride		TaON	P2_{1}/c	
		CaTaO_{2}N	perovskite	
		SrTaO_{2}N	perovskite	
		BaTaO_{2}N	perovskite	
		CaNbO_{2}N	perovskite	
		SrNbO_{2}N	perovskite	
		Sr_{2}NbO_{3}N		
strontium gallium oxynitride		Sr_{4}GaN_{3}O	red Pbca a = 7.4002 b = 24.3378 c = 7.4038Å, Z = 8	
		Sr_{3}Nb_{2}O_{5}N_{2}		
		In_{32}ON_{17}F_{43}	Ia3̅ a=10.536 fluorite structure	
		BaNbO_{2}N	perovskite	
		LaTaON_{2}		
		LnTiO_{2}N		
		LnTaO_{2}N		
		EuTaO_{2}N		
		EuNbO_{2}N		
		LnNbO_{2}N		
		LnVO_{2}N		
		CaTiO_{2}N		
		CaZrO_{2}N		
		LaZrO_{2}N		
		EuWON_{2}		
		Ln_{2}AlO_{3}N		
Praseodymium(V) oxide nitride		PrON	molecular	
Phosphoryl nitride	PNO		α-quartz, β-cristobalite, or moganite structure	
Titanium nickel oxynitride		NiTiNO		
Chromium oxynitride		Cr(N,O)		
galloaluminophosphate oxynitride	AlGaPON			
zinc oxynitride	ZnON			
Titanium oxynitride		TiO_{x}N_{y}		
		K_{2}Ca_{2}Ta_{3}O_{9}N·2H_{2}O	perovskite	
		K_{2}LaTa_{2}O_{6}N·1.6H_{2}O		
Niobium oxynitride		NbON	pressure-induced baddeleyite to cotunnite structure transition	
