= Oxyhydride =

Class of chemical compounds

An oxyhydride is a mixed anion compound containing both oxide O^{2−} and hydride ions H^{−}. These compounds may be unexpected as the hydrogen and oxygen could be expected to react to form water. But if the metals making up the cations are electropositive enough, and the conditions are reducing enough, solid materials can be made that combine hydrogen and oxygen in the negative ion role.

== Production ==
The first oxyhydride to be discovered was lanthanum oxyhydride, a 1982 discovery. It was made by heating lanthanum oxide in an atmosphere of hydrogen at 900 °C. However, heating transition metal oxides with hydrogen usually results in water and the reduced metal.

Topochemical synthesis retains the basic structure of the parent compound, and only does the minimum rearrangements of atoms to convert to the final product. Topotactic transitions retain the original crystal symmetry. Reactions at lower temperatures do not distort the existing structure. Oxyhydrides in a topochemical synthesis can be produced by heating oxides with sodium hydride NaH or calcium hydride CaH_{2} at temperatures from 200–600 °C. TiH_{2} or LiH can also be used as an agent to introduce hydride. If calcium hydroxide or sodium hydroxide is formed, it might be able to be washed away. However for some starting oxides, this kind of hydride reduction might just yield an oxygen-deficient oxide.

Reactions under hot high-pressure hydrogen can result from heating hydrides with oxides. A suitable seal for the lid on the container is required, and one such substance is sodium chloride.

Oxyhydrides all contain an alkali metal, alkaline earth metal, or rare-earth element, which are needed in order to put electronic charge on hydrogen.

== Properties ==
The hydrogen bonding in oxyhydrides can be covalent, metallic, and ionic bonding, depending on the metals present in the compound.

Oxyhydrides lose their hydrogen less than the pure metal hydrides.

The hydrogen in oxyhydrides is much more exchangeable. For example oxynitrides can be made at much lower temperatures by heating the oxyhydride in ammonia or nitrogen gas (say around 400 °C rather than 900 °C required for an oxide) Acidic attack can replace the hydrogen, for example moderate heating in hydrogen fluoride yields compounds containing oxide, fluoride, and hydride ions (oxyfluorohydride.) The hydrogen is more thermolabile, and can be lost by heating yielding a reduced valence metal compound.

Changing the ratio of hydrogen and oxygen can modify electrical or magnetic properties. Then band gap can be altered. The hydride atom can be mobile in a compound undergoing electron coupled hydride transfer. The hydride ion is highly polarisable, so it presence raised the dielectric constant and refractive index.

Some oxyhydrides have photocatalytic capability. For example BaTiO_{2.5}H_{0.5} can function as a catalyst for ammonia production from hydrogen and nitrogen.

The hydride ion is quite variable in size, ranging from 130 to 153 pm.

The hydride ion actually does not only have a −1 charge, but will have a charge dependent on its environment, so it is often written as H^{δ−}. In oxyhydrides, the hydride ion is much more compressible than the other atoms in compounds. Hydride is the only anion with no π orbital, so if it is incorporated into a compound, it acts as a π-blocker, reducing dimensionality of the solid.

Oxyhydride structures with heavy metals cannot be properly studied with X-ray diffraction, as hydrogen hardly has any effect on X-rays. Neutron diffraction can be used to observe hydrogen, but not if there are heavy neutron absorbers like Eu, Sm, Gd, Dy in the material.

== List ==
Formula	Structure	Space group	Unit cell	Volume	Density	Comments	Reference
Na_{3}SO_{4}H	tetrahedral	P4/nmm	a=7.0034 c=4.8569				
[η^{1}-3,5-tBu_{2}pz(η-Al)H)_{2}O]_{2} pz=pyrazolato	triclinic	P1̅	a=10.202 b=13.128 c=13.612 α=112.39 β=101.90 γ=96.936 Z=1	1608.7	1.162		
(^{Me}LAlH)_{2}(μ-O)^{Me}L = HC[(CMe)N(2,4,6-Me_{3}C_{6}H_{2})]_{2}^{–}						white	
CaTiO_{3−x}H_{x} (x ≤ 0.6)						Conducting; H in disordered position	
Mg_{2}AlNi_{X}H_{Z}O_{Y}							
Sr_{2}LiH_{3}O						ionic conductor	
Sr_{3}AlO_{4}H	tetragonal	I4/mcm	a =6.7560 c =11.1568				
Sr_{21}Si_{2}O_{5}H_{14}	cubic						
Sr_{5}(BO_{3})_{3}H	orthorhombic	Pnma	a=7.1982, b=14.1461, c=9.8215	1000.10		decomposed by water	
LiSr_{2}SiO_{4}H	monoclinic	P2_{1}/m	a = 6.5863, b = 5.4236, c = 6.9501, β = 112.5637			air stable	
Sr_{21}Si_{2}O_{5}H_{12+x}	cubic	Fd3̅m	a = 19.1190				
Sr_{5}(PO_{4})_{3}H	hexagonal	P6_{3}/m	a = 9.7169, c = 7.2747	594.83		for deuteride	
Sr_{2}CaAlO_{4}H	tetragonal	I4/mcm	a= 6.6220 c= 10.9812	481.531			
SrScO_{2}H	cubic	Pm3̅m	a = 4.0483			mechanochemical synthesis	
SrTiO_{3−x}H_{x} (x ≤ 0.6)						Conducting; H in disordered position	
SrVO_{2}H							
Sr_{2}VO_{3}H							
Sr_{3}V_{2}O_{5}H_{2}							
SrCrO_{2}H	cubic					produced under 5GPa 1000 °C	
Sr_{3}Co_{2}O_{4.33}H_{0.84}						insulator	
YHO	orthorhombic	Pnma	a = 7.5367, b = 3.7578, c = 5.3249				
YO_{x}H_{y}						photochromic; band gap 2.6 eV	
Zr_{3}V_{3}OD_{5}							
Zr_{5}Al3OH_{5}							
Ba_{3}AlO_{4}H	orthorhombic	Pnma	Z=4,a=10.4911,b=8.1518,c=7.2399				
Ba_{21}Si_{2}O_{5}H_{14}	cubic	Fd3̅m	a=20.336				
Ba_{21}Si_{2}O_{5}H_{24}	cubic	Fd3̅m	a = 20.336			Zintl phase	
BaScO_{2}H	cubic	Pm3̅m	a=4.1518				
Ba_{2}ScHO_{3}						H^{−} conductor	
BaTiO_{3−x}H_{x} (x ≤ 0.6)						Conducting; H in disordered position	
Ba_{2}NaTiO_{3}H_{3}	cubic	Fm3̅m	a=8.29714				
BaVO_{3−x}H_{x} (x = .3)						5 GPa hexagonal, 7GPa cubic	
Ba_{2}NaVO_{2.4}H_{3.6}	cubic	Fm3̅m	a=8.22670				
BaCrO_{2}H	hexagonal	P6_{3}/mmc	a =5.6559 c =13.7707				
Ba_{2}NaCrO_{2.2}H_{3.8}	cubic	Fm3̅m	a=8.17470				
Ba_{21}Zn_{2}O_{5}H_{12}	cubic	Fd3̅m	a = 20.417				
Ba_{21}Zn_{2}O_{5}H_{24}	cubic	Fd3̅m	a = 20.417				
Ba_{21}Ga_{2}O_{5}H_{24}	cubic	Fd3̅m				Zintl phase	
Ba_{21}Ge_{2}O_{5}H_{14}	cubic	Fd3̅m	a=20.356				
Ba_{21}Ge_{2}O_{5}H_{24}	cubic	Fd3̅m	a = 20.356			Zintl phase	
Ba_{21}As_{2}O_{5}H_{16}	cubic	Fd3̅m	a=20.230				
Ba_{21}As_{2}O_{5}H_{24}	cubic	Fd3̅m	a = 20.230				
Sr_{2}BaAlO_{4}H	tetragonal	I4/mcm	a =6.9093 c =11.2107				
BaYO_{2}H	cubic	Pm3̅m	a = 4.3068			mechanochemical synthesis	
Ba_{2}YHO_{3}			a=4.38035 c=13.8234			H^{−} conductor	
Ba_{21}Cd_{2}O_{5}H_{12}	cubic	Fd3̅m	a=20.633				
Ba_{21}Cd_{2}O_{5}H_{24}	cubic	Fd3̅m	a = 20.633				
Ba_{21}In_{2}O_{5}H_{12}	cubic	Fd3̅m	a=20.607				
Ba_{21}In_{2}O_{5}H_{24}	cubic	Fd3̅m	a = 20.607			Zintl phase	
Ba_{21}Sn_{2}O_{5}H_{14}	cubic	Fd3̅m	a=20.532				
Ba_{21}Sn_{2}O_{5}H_{24}	cubic	Fd3̅m	a = 20.532				
Ba_{21}Sb_{2}O_{5}H_{16}	cubic	Fd3̅m	a=20.419				
Ba_{21}Sb_{2}O_{5}H_{24}	cubic	Fd3̅m	a = 20.419				
Ba_{21}Pb_{2}O_{5}H_{14}	cubic	Fd3̅m	a=20.597				
LaHO							
La_{2}LiHO_{3}	orthorhombic	Immm	a=3.57152 b=3.76353 c=12.9785				
La_{0.6}Sr_{1.4}LiH_{1.6}O_{2}						H^{−} conductor	
LaSr_{3}NiRuO_{4}H_{4}							
LaSrMnO_{3.3}H_{0.7}						high-pressure fabrication	
LaSrCoO_{3}H_{0.7}						insulator	
CeHO							
CeNiH_{Z}O_{Y}						Catalyse ethanol to H_{2}	
Nd_{0.8}Sr_{0.2}NiO_{2}H_{x} (x = 0.2–0.5)						superconductor for x between 0.22 and 0.28	
NdHO		P4/nmm P6̅2m	a=7.8480, c=5.5601 V=342.46 a = 5.99429, c = 3.49252			3 GPa	
PrHO							
GdHO		Fm3̅m P6̅2m	a = 5.38450 a = 5.84710, c = 3.38983			5 GPa	
EuTiO_{3−x}H_{x} (x ≤ 0.6)						Conducting; H in disordered position	
HoHO		F4̅3m	a = 5.2755			light-yellow under the sun; pink indoors	
DyHO	cubic	F4̅3m	a=5.3095				
ErHO	cubic	F4̅3m P6̅2m	a=5.24615 a = 5.70986, c = 3.29915			5 GPa	
LuHO	cubic	F4̅3m	a=5.17159				
LuHO	orthorhombic	Pnma	a = 7.3493, b = 3.6747, c = 5.1985				
Ba_{21}Hg_{2}O_{5}H_{12}	cubic	Fd3̅m	a=20.507				
Ba_{21}Tl_{2}O_{5}H_{12}	cubic	Fd3̅m	a=20.68				
Ba_{21}Tl_{2}O_{5}H_{24}	cubic	Fd3̅m	a = 20.68			Zintl phase	
Ba_{21}Hg_{2}O_{5}H_{24}	cubic	Fd3̅m	a = 20.507				
Ba_{21}Pb_{2}O_{5}H_{24}	cubic	Fd3̅m	a = 20.597				
Ba_{21}Bi_{2}O_{5}H_{16}	cubic	Fd3̅m	a=20.459				
PuHO						Formed during corrosion of plutonium metal in water	

=== Three or more anions ===
Formula	Structure	Space group	Unit cell	Comments	Reference
Eu_{2}LiHOCl_{2}	orthorhombic	Cmcm	a = 14.923 b = 5.7012 c = 11.4371 Z = 8	density 5.444; yellow	
Sr_{2}LiHOCl_{2}	orthorhombic	Cmcm	a = 15.0235 b = 5.69899 c = 11.4501	synthesized at ambient pressure and 2 GPa; ordered H/O	
Sr_{2}LiHOCl_{2}	tetragonal	I4/mmm	a = 4.04215 c = 15.04359	synthesized at 5 GPa; disordered H/O	
Sr_{2}LiHOBr_{2}	tetragonal	I4/mmm	a = 4.1097 c = 16.1864	synthesized at 5 GPa; disordered H/O	
Ba_{2}LiHOCl_{2}	tetragonal	I4/mmm	a = 4.26816 c = 15.6877	synthesized at 5 GPa; disordered H/O	

== See also ==
- Hydrous oxide (oxide-hydroxide)
- Aldehyde
