= Nitride fluoride =

Class of chemical compounds

Nitride fluorides containing nitride and fluoride ions with the formula NF^{4-}. They can be electronically equivalent to a pair of oxide ions O_{2}^{4-}. Nitride fluorides were discovered in 1996 by Lavalle et al. They heated diammonium technetium hexafluoride to 300 °C to yield TcNF. Another preparation is to heat a fluoride compound with a nitride compound in a solid state reaction. The fluorimido ion is F-N^{2-} and is found in a rhenium compound.

| name | formula | N:F ratio | system | space group | unit cell (Å) | volume | density | properties | references |
|---|---|---|---|---|---|---|---|---|---|
| dimagnesium fluoride nitride | L-Mg_{2}NF | 1:1 | tetragonal | I4_{1}/amd | a = 4.186, c = 10.042 | | | decompose over 1000 °C to MgF_{2}, Mg gas and N_{2} | |
| | H-Mg_{2}NF | 1:1 | | | | | | H for 1250-1350 °C and 20 kbar | |
| | Mg_{3}NF_{3} | 1:3 | cubic | Pm3̅m | a = 4.216 | | | light green | |
| dicalcium fluoride nitride | Ca_{2}NF | 1:1 | cubic | Fd3̅m | a = 10.0215, Z = 16 | 1006.46 | 2.987 | light yellow | |
| dichromium fluoride nitride | Cr_{2}NF_{3} | 1:3 | | | | | | dark green | |
| dicobalt fluoride nitride | Co_{2}NF | 1:1 | | | | | | | |
| dicopper fluoride nitride | Cu_{2}NF | 1:1 | | | | | | | |
| | CaMgNF | 1:1 | | | | | | | |
| | Fe_{4}N_{3}F_{3} | 1:1 | | | | | | | |
| α | Zn_{2}NF | 1:1 | orthorhombic | P2_{1}2_{1}2_{1} | a = 5.850, b = 5.892, c = 6.536 | | | band gap 2.7 eV | |
| β | Zn_{2}NF | 1:1 | tetragonal | P4_{1}2_{1}2 | a = 5.873, c = 6.532 | | | band gap 2.8 eV | |
| | Zn_{9}N_{4}F_{6} | 2:3 | | | | | | 2 allotropes | |
| | Zn_{7}N_{4}F | 4:1 | | | | | | | |
| distrontium fluoride nitride | Sr_{2}NF | 1:1 | | Fd3̅m | a = 10.692, Z = 16 | | | yellowish brown | |
| distrontium fluoride nitride | Sr_{2}NF | 1:1 | | Fd3m | a = 10.765, Z = 16 | | | dark red | |
| | SrCaNF | 1:1 | cubic | Fd3̅m | a = 10.340, Z = 16 | 1105.6 | 3.862 | yellow | |
| | YNF_{3} | 1:3 | hexagonal | | a = 5.93, c = 4.79 | | | | |
| | Zr_{4}ON_{3}F_{5} | 3:5 | monoclinic | P112_{1}/b | a = 5.1217, b = 21.513, c = 5.3669, γ = 90.128°, Z = 4 | | | | |
| | ZrNF | 1:1 | monoclinic | P21/c | a = 5.227, b = 5.026, c = 5.191, β = 98.98° | | | | |
| | NaZr_{3}N_{3}F_{4} | 3:4 | | P6_{3}/mmc | a = 3.654, c = 18.266 | | | | |
| | TcNF | 1:1 | hexagonal | | a = 5.98, c = 4.79 | | | | |
| dibarium fluoride nitride | Ba_{2}NF | 1:1 | | Fm3̅m | a = 5.679, Z = 2 | | | dark violet | |
| | LaN_{x}F_{3(1-x}} | x:3(1-x} | cubic | | a = 5.847–5.871 | | | | |
| | Ce_{3}NF_{6} | 1:6 | | | a = 5.8027 | | | F^{−} conductor | |
| | Pr_{3}NF_{6} | 1:6 | | | a = 5.7723 | | | | |
| | Gd_{3}NF_{6} | 1:6 | cubic | | a = 5.617 | | | | |
| | Ce_{2}MnN_{3}F_{2−δ} | | tetragonal | P4/nmm | a = 3.8554, c = 13.088 | | | Nitridomanganate | |
| | LiSr_{2}[TaN_{3}]F | 3:1 | orthorhombic | Pbca | a = 10.768, b = 5.591, c = 15.891, Z 8 | 956.7 | | Nitridotantalate, red, air sensitive | |
| | ReNF | 1:1 | tetragonal | | a = 5.88, c = 13.00 | | | | |
| | Bi_{3}NF_{6} | 1:6 | orthorhombic | Pbcm | a = 5.8174, b = 5.7018, c = 18.5113, Z = 4 | 614.01 | 8.165 | grey, moisture sensitive | |
| | ThNF | 1:1 | rhombohedral | | a = 7.13 | | | | |
| | ThN_{x}F_{4-3x} | | tetragonal | | | | | | |
| | UN_{x}F_{y} (UNF) | 1:1 | orthorhombic | | a = 5.632–5.643, b = 5.602–5.610, c = 5.712–5.707 | | | | |
Complexes
| | (AsPh^{+}_{4})_{2}[O_{2}(TcNF_{2})_{2}]^{2-} | 1:2 | | | | | | yellow, O-bridged | |
| | Rb_{4}[O(TcNF_{4})_{2}] | 1:4 | | | | | | orange yellow | |
| | Cs_{4}[O(TcNF_{4})_{2}] | 1:4 | | | | | | orange yellow | |
| | H[TcNF_{4}] | 1:4 | | | | | | | |
| | (NEt_{4})_{3}(NH_{4})[Tc_{4}N_{4}O_{4}F_{8}] | | | | | | | yellow green | |
molecules
| phosphonitrile fluoride (trimer) | (NPF_{2})_{3} | 1:2 | rhombohedral | | | | | triple point 27.8 °C; refractive index n_{α} = 1.388, n_{β} = 1.419, n_{γ} = 1.443 | |
| phosphonitrile fluoride (tetramer) | (NPF_{2})_{4} | 1:2 | monoclinic | | | | | triple point 30.5 °C | |
| poly-phosphonitrile fluoride | (NPF_{2})_{n} | 1:2 | | | | | | | |
| | ReNF_{3} | 1:3 | | | | | | brown | |
| rhenium tetrafluoride nitride | ReNF_{4} | 1:4 | orthorhombic | | a = 5.64, b = 14.76, c = 4.26 | 354.6 | | yellow, molecular, mp 85 °C | |
| fluoroimidorhenium pentafluoride | ReNF_{6} | 1:6 | monoclinic | | a = 5.298, b = 9.286, c = 9.979, β = 109.4, Z = 4 | 463.2 | 4.507 | orange, molecular, N-F bonded, mp 80 °C | |
