= Oxalate nitrate =

Class of chemical compounds

An oxalate nitrate is a chemical compound or salt that contains oxalate and nitrate anions (NO_{3}^{−} and C_{2}O_{4}^{2-}). These are mixed anion compounds. Some have third anions. Oxalate acts as a ligand, which normally complexes two metal atoms.

== Naming ==
An oxalate nitrate compound may also be called a nitrate oxalate. In chemical formulae, oxalate may be indicated by "ox". As a ligand oxalate is termed "oxalato", and nitrate, "nitrato".

== Production ==
Most oxalate nitrates are formed by crystallisation from water solutions. One issue is the insolubility of metal oxalates.

== Properties ==
On heating, oxalate nitrates lose NO_{2}, NO, CO, and CO_{2} and form metal carbonates or oxides.

== Related ==
Related to these are the oxalate phosphates and oxalate perchlorates.

== List ==
name	formula	ratio C_{2}O_{4}:NO_{3}	mw	system	space group	unit cell Å	volume	density	properties	references
phen = 1,10-phenanthroline	[Cr(phen)_{2}(C_{2}O_{4})]NO_{3}·H_{2}C_{2}O_{4}·H_{2}O			monoclinic	Cc	a=15.856 b=14.353 c=13.141 β=106.517° Z=4	2867	1.553	orange	
bpy = 2,2′-bipyridine	[Cr(bpy)_{2}(C_{2}O_{4})]NO_{3}·1/2H_{2}C_{2}O_{4}·4H_{2}O			monoclinic	P2_{1}/c	a=10.5565 b=17.1770 c=14.8525 β=99.272° Z=4	2658.00	1.578	orange	
fac-triammin-aquo-oxalato-cobalt(III)-nitrate monohydrate,	fac-[Co(NH_{3})_{3}(C_{2}O_{4})(H_{2}O)]NO_{3}·H_{2}O			monoclinic	P2_{1}/n	a=7.853 b=10.000 c=13.192 β=105.06°				
	[Co(NH_{3})_{4}(C_{2}O_{4})]NO_{3}·H_{2}O				P2_{1}2_{1}2_{1}	a=7.944 b=9.90 c=12.700 Z=4	999.15	1.968		
Oxalato di(1,10-phenanthroline-N,N′) cobalt(III) nitrate 3.88 hydrate	[Co(C_{12}H_{8}N_{2})_{2}(C_{2}O_{4})]NO_{3}·3.88H_{2}O		639.14	orthorhombic	Ibca	a = 15.492 b = 17.938 c = 19.635 Z = 8	5457	1.556	pink	
ept = N-(2-aminoethyl)-1,3-diaminopropane	[(Ni(ept)H_{2}O)_{2}ox](NO_{3})_{2}									
	Ni_{2}en_{4}(C_{2}O_{4})(NO_{3})_{2}									
bpy = 2,2′-bipyridine	[{Ni(bpy)_{2}}_{2}(μ-C_{2}O_{4})](NO_{3})_{2}·H_{2}C_{2}O_{4}		1044.23	triclinic	P1̅	a 9.2921 b 12.8702 c 18.9812 α 84.660° β 75.969° γ 85.056° Z=2	2187.9	1.585	violet	
m-xpt = bis(pyridyltriazole) ligand	[Ni_{2}(m-xpt)_{2}(C_{2}O_{4})](NO_{3})_{2}									
dien = diethylenetriamine	(H_{3}dien)[Ni(NO_{3})(C_{2}O_{4})_{2}].2H_{2}O			monoclinic	P2_{1}/c	a=10.218 b=11.074 c=14.897 β=103.988°			blue	
bpt = pyridyltriazole ligand	Cu_{2}(bpt)_{2}(NO_{3})_{2}(DMF)_{2}(C_{2}O_{4})									
	[(Cu(ept))_{2}ox](NO_{3})_{2}·H_{2}O									
Diethylenetriammonium nitrato-bis(oxalato)cuprate (II) dihydrate	(H_{3}dien)[Cu(NO_{3})(C_{2}O_{4})_{2}].2H_{2}O			monoclinic	P2_{1}/c	a = 10.1054 b = 11.0825 c = 14.8238 β = 103.516° Z = 4	1614.2			
dien=diethylenetriamine	[Cu_{2}(C_{2}O_{4})(dien)_{2}](NO_{3})_{3}			monoclinic	P2/c	a = 23.7888(10), b = 6.7055(3), c = 12.7842(6) and β = 95.534				
Sparteine copper(II) nitrate oxalate	Cu_{2}(C_{15}H_{26}N_{2})_{2}(NO_{3})_{2}(C_{2}O_{4})	1:2							light green	
di-2-pyridylamine	Cu_{2}(dpyam)_{2}(μ-C_{2}O_{4})(NO_{3})_{2}(DMF)_{2}			triclinic	P1	a=8.353 b=9.100 c=12.245 α=72.035° β=75.228° γ=78.552°				
(μ_{2}-oxalato)-bis(di-2-pyridylamine)-bis(N,N',-dimethylformamide)-di-copper(ii) iodide nitrate	[Cu_{2}(dpyam)_{2}(μ-C_{2}O_{4})(DMF)_{2}](I)_{1.6}(NO_{3})_{0.4}			triclinic	P1̅	a=8.4616 b=8.9112 c=12.3824 α=71.913° β=76.329° γ=80.225°				
	Cu_{2}(dpyam)_{2}(C_{2}O_{4})(NO_{3})_{2}((CH_{3})_{2}SO)_{2}]									
	Cu_{2}(bpy)_{2}(C_{2}O_{4})(NO_{3})_{2}(H_{2}O)_{2}									
meprizole=(4-methoxy-2-(5-methoxy-3-methylo-pyrazol-1-yl)-6-methylpyrmadine)	[Cu_{2}(mepirizole)_{2}(C_{2}O_{4})(NO_{3})_{2}(H_{2}O)]_{2}[Cu_{2}(mepirizole)_{2}(C_{2}O_{4})(NO_{3})_{2}]			monoclinic	P2_{1}/c	a=20.073 b=13.842 c=11.451 β=119.09° Z=4				
	Cu_{2}(histamine)_{2}(C_{2}O_{4})(H_{2}O)_{2}(NO_{3})_{2}			triclinic	P1	a=7.579 b=8.133 c=9.161 α=77.06° β=89.23° γ=82.54° Z=1	545.6			
	[Cu_{2}(bpy)_{2}(C_{2}O_{4})(H_{2}O)_{2}][Cu(bpy)(C_{2}O_{4})](NO_{3})_{2}									
trimeen = N,N,N'-trimethylethylenediamine	[(Cu(trimeen)H_{2}O)_{2}ox](NO_{3})_{2} ·2H_{2}O									
Pz_{2}CPh_{2} = diphenyldipyrazolylmethane	Cu_{2}(Pz_{2}CPh_{2})_{2}(NO_{3})_{2}(μ-C_{2}O_{4})			triclinic	P1̅	a = 8.863 b = 10.241 c = 11.43 α = 98.98° β = 110.45° γ = 103.66° Z=2				
Pz^{3m}_{2}CPh_{2} = diphenylbis(3-methylpyrazolyl)methane	[Cu_{2}(Pz^{3m}_{2}CPh_{2})_{2}(H_{2}O)_{2}(μ-C_{2}O_{4})](NO_{3})_{2}·H_{2}O			monoclinic	C2/c	a = 23.459 b = 8.8568 c = 21.782 β = 100.889° Z=4				
phen = 1,10-phenanthroline; (μ_{2}-Oxalato-O,O',O'',O''')-diaqua-bis(1,10-phenanthroline)-di-copper(ii) dinitrate	[Cu_{2}(ox)(phen)_{2}(H_{2}O)_{2}](NO_{3})_{2}			monoclinic	P2_{1}/n	a=7.128 b=11.715 c=16.529 β=91.80°				
4,4’-bipyridine; 1,10-phenanthroline;	[Cu_{2}(ox)(4,4’-bpy)(phen)_{2}](NO_{3})_{2}		855.72	monoclinic	C2/c	a=23.144 b=10.6601 c=13.4363 β=93.123° Z=4	3310.4		green	
Bipy = 2,2′-bipyridine;	Cu_{2}(Bipy)_{2}(H_{2}O)_{2}(C_{2}O_{4})(NO_{3})_{2}									
μ-oxalato-κ^{4}O^{1},O^{2}:O^{1′},O^{2′}-bis(aqua(nitrato-κO){[1-(2-pyridyl-κN)ethylidene]hydrazine-κN}copper(II)) μ-oxalato-κ^{4}O^{1},O^{2}:O^{1′},O^{2′}-bis((methanol-κO)(nitrato-κO){[1-(2-pyridyl-κN)ethylidene]hydrazine-κN}copper(II))	[Cu_{2}(C_{2}O_{4})(NO_{3})_{2}(C_{7}H_{9}N_{3})_{2}(H_{2}O)_{2}][Cu_{2}(C_{2}O_{4})(NO_{3})_{2}(C_{7}H_{9}N_{3})_{2}(CH_{4}O)_{2}]			triclinic	P1̅	a = 9.8358 b = 12.377 c = 12.714 α = 103.704° β = 112.573° γ = 107.821° Z = 1	1245.15			
(μ_{2}-oxalato)-bis(dimethylsulfoxido)-bis(di-2-pyridylamine)-dinitrato-di-copper(ii)	[Cu_{2}(dpyam)_{2}(C_{2}O_{4})(NO_{3})_{2}((CH_{3})_{2}SO)_{2}			triclinic	P1̅	a 8.7190 b 8.9680 c 11.421 α 68.58° β 77.79° γ 80.58°				
(μ_{2}-Oxalato-O,O',O'',O''')-diaqua-bis(2,3-bis(2-pyridyl)pyrazine)-di-copper(ii) dinitrate tetrahydrate	[Cu_{2}(dpp)_{2}(H_{2}O)_{2}(NO_{3})_{2}(ox)]·4H_{2}O			monoclinic	P2_{1}/c	a=9.704b=7.2598 c=25.865 β=97.395°				
L=4,4′-methylenebis(1-(2-pyridyl)-3,5-dimethylpyrazole; (μ_{2}-4,4'-Methylenebis(1-(2-pyridyl)-3,5-dimethylpyrazole))-bis(nitrato-O)-di-copper acetonitrile solvate	CuL(C_{2}O_{4})(NO_{3})			monoclinic	P2/n	a=8.5679 b=9.3862 c=20.5910 β=101.038°				
bis(μ_{2}-oxalato)-tetrakis(2,2'-bipyridine)-(oxalato)-di-copper(ii)-chromium(iii) nitrate monohydrate	[{Cu(μ-C_{2}O_{4})(bpy)_{2}}_{2}Cr(C_{2}O_{4})]NO_{3}·H_{2}O			monoclinic	C2/c	a=6.428 b=17.162 c=16.749 β=110.721°				
bis(tris(2,2'-bipyridine)-copper(ii)) tris(oxalato)-chromium(iii) nitrate nonahydrate	[Cu(bpy)_{3}]_{2}[Cr(C_{2}O_{4})_{3}]NO_{3}·9H_{2}O			monoclinic	P2_{1}/c	a=31.314 b=13.536 c=22.202 β=132.01°				
(μ_{2}-Oxalato)-tetrakis(μ_{2}-N,N'-propane-1,3-bis(3-methoxysalicylideneiminato))-diaqua-bis(nitrato-O)-tetra-copper(ii)-di-neodymium(iii) dinitrate hexahydrate	[{(LCu^{II}(ONO_{2}))(LCu^{II}(H_{2}O))Nd^{III}}_{2}(μ-C_{2}O_{4})](NO_{3})_{2} · 6H_{2}O			monoclinic	P2_{1}	a=16.982 b=15.241 c=17.368 β=96.71°				
	(H_{3}O,N_{2}H_{5})_{5}{[Ce(H_{2}O)][Ce(NO_{3})]_{2}(C_{2}O_{4})_{6}}.6H_{2}O			tetragonal	P4_{3}2_{1}2	a=11.6521 c=27.9597				
	(H_{3}O,N_{2}H_{5})_{2}{Nd(C_{2}O_{4})_{2}NO_{3}}			monoclinic	P2_{1}/c	a=9.296 b=17.214 c=9.214 β=116.586				
	(H_{3}O,N_{2}H_{5})_{2}(NO_{3})_{2}{Eu_{2}(H_{2}O)_{6}(C_{2}O_{4})_{3}}			monoclinic	P2_{1}/n	a=8.0806 b=18.986 c=17.318 β=99.331°				
melaminium	[C_{3}H_{7}N_{6}]_{6}[Dy(C_{2}O_{4})_{4}][NO_{3}]			triclinic	P1̅	a=9.777 b=10.676 c=25.083 α=97.18° β=79.81° γ=86.52°	2570			
melaminium	[C_{3}H_{7}N_{6}]_{6}[Ho(C_{2}O_{4})_{4}][NO_{3}]			triclinic	P1̅	a=9.760 b=10.660 c=25.051 α=87.24° β=87.24° γ=79.96°	2559			
	(N_{2}H_{5}){Er(C_{2}O_{4})_{2}}._{2}H_{2}O			tetragonal	P4_{3}2_{1}2	a=11.3348 c=9.2646				
melaminium	[C_{3}H_{7}N_{6}]_{6}[Yb(C_{2}O_{4})_{4}][NO_{3}]			triclinic	P1̅	a=9.7297 b=10.5937 c=24.9904 α=87.271° β=80.123° γ=86.955°	2532.15			
lead nitrate oxalate	Pb_{2}(NO_{3})_{2}(C_{2}O_{4})⋅2H_{2}O			monoclinic	P2_{1}/c	a=10.623 b=7.9559 c=6.1932 β=104.49° Z=4				
	(OPb_{2})_{2}(C_{2}O_{4})(NO_{3})_{2}			monoclinic	P2_{1}/c	a=11.8682 b=5.2501 c=9.0989 β=96.741°				
μ-Oxalato-κ^{4}O^{1},O^{2}:O^{1′},O^{2′}-bis[aqua(2,2′-bipyridine-κN)(nitrato-κ^{2}O,O′)lead(II)]	Pb_{2}(C_{2}O_{4})(NO_{3})_{2}(C_{10}H_{8}N_{2})_{2}(H_{2}O)_{2}			monoclinic	P2_{1}/c	a=9.579 b=20.633 c=6.765 β=91.687° Z=2	1336.5			
bipy = 2,2′-bipyridine; (μ_{2}-oxalato)-bis(2,2'-bipyridine)-dinitrato-diaqua-di-lead	Pb_{2}(ox)(bipy)_{2}(NO_{3})_{2}(H_{2}O)_{2}			monoclinic	P2_{1}/c	a=9.5444 b=20.5956 c=6.7449 β=91.819°				
phen = 1,10-phenanthroline	{Pb(phen)_{2}}_{2}Cr(ox)_{2}(phen)][Cr(ox)_{2}(phen)](NO_{3})_{2}			triclinic	P1̅	a 13.311 b 18.861 c 19.500 α 115.14° β 107.54° γ 96.28°				
	AgPb(C_{2}O_{4})(NO_{3})								heat decompose to Ag and PbCO_{3}	
tetraethyldiglycolamide	[Th(TEDGA)_{2}(C_{2}O_{4})][NO_{3}]_{2}[H_{2}C_{2}O_{4}].6H_{2}O		1128.86	tetragonal	P4_{2}2_{1}2	a=18.714 c=12.9212 Z=4	4525.2	1.657	@100K Th is 10 coordinate	
tetraethyldiglycolamide	[Th_{2}(C_{2}O_{4})_{3}(TEDGA)_{4}][NO_{3}][HC_{2}O_{4}][H_{2}C_{2}O_{4}]_{4}.7H_{2}O		2340.47	triclinic	P1̅	a=15.6611 b=17.9082 c=18.1814 α=89.896° β=65.549° γ=87.623° Z=2	4637.2	1.676	@100K is 10 coordinate, bicapped square antiprism	
diammonium oxalatotetranitratouranylate	(NH_{4})_{2}[{UO_{2}(NO_{3})_{2}}_{2}(μ_{4}-C_{2}O_{4})] · 2H_{2}O	1:4		monoclinic	P2_{1}/c	a = 8.650 b = 11.700 c = 20.213 β = 93.92° Z = 4	2040.9			
Aqua-(2,2'-bipyridine)-bis(nitrato)-(μ_{2}-oxalato)-dioxo-uranium(vi)-copper(ii)	UO_{2}Cu(C_{2}O_{4})(NO_{3})_{2}(bipy)(H_{2}O)			triclinic	P1̅	a 7.7582 b 11.0274 c 12.181 α 66.717° β 85.541° γ 87.653°				
(μ_{2}-2,2'-bipyrimidine)-bis(μ_{2}-oxalato)-bis(μ_{2}-hydroxo)-tetraoxo-bis(nitrato)-di-copper-di-uranium	[(UO_{2})_{2}Cu_{2}(C_{2}O_{4})_{2}(bipym)_{3}(OH)_{2}]·2NO_{3}			triclinic	P1̅	a 9.9169 b 10.9294 c 11.1783 α 103.449° β 110.754° γ 110.069°				
	[C_{6}H_{14}N]_{4}[UO_{2}(C_{2}O_{4})_{2}(HC_{2}O_{4})]NO_{3}·2H_{2}O		1033.86	monoclinic	P2_{1}/c	a=11.9358 b=18.7279 c=19.1956 β=102.210° Z=4	4193.8	1.637		
	[C_{8}H_{18}N][UO_{2}(C_{2}O_{4})(NO_{3})]			monoclinic	P2_{1}/c	a=11.3688 b=11.0238 c=13.4478 β=11.465° Z=4	1557.5	2.338		
