= Oxalate fluoride =

Class of chemical compounds

An oxalate fluoride is a mixed anion compound contains both oxalate and fluoride anions. Many of these compounds have high birefringence.

With nonmetals, some are related to the oxalatophosphates and oxalatoborates with the addition of fluoride.

== Formation ==
For some metal oxalate complexes, fluoride can displace some oxalate. This happens with aluminium.

With gallium the reverse happens, and oxalate displaces fluoride ligands.

== Use ==
Difluorooxalaotoborates are under investigation as electrolytes, or electrolyte additives in lithium ion batteries or supercapacitors. Their advantage is greater thermal stability, up to 200 or 300 °C, ability to form ionic liquids, and for supercapacitors, support for higher voltages (3 volts).

== List ==
formula	name	crystal	space group	cell	volume	density	comment	ref
N(CH_{3})_{4}BF_{2}C_{2}O_{4}	tetramethylammonium difluoro(oxalato)borate							
N(CH_{2}CH_{3})_{4}BF_{2}C_{2}O_{4}	tetraethylammonium difluoro(oxalato)borate							
	triethylmethylammonium difluoro(oxalato)borate						melt 15 °C; white	
N(-CH_{2}CH_{2}CH_{2}CH_{2}-)(CH_{2}CH_{2}CH_{3})(CH_{3})BF_{2}C_{2}O_{4}	N-Propyl-N-Methylpyrrolidinium Difluoro(oxalato)borate (Py_{13}DFOB)						melt 3.21 °C	
N(-CH_{2}CH_{2}CH_{2}CH_{2}-)(CH_{2}CH_{2}CH_{2}CH_{3})(CH_{3})BF_{2}C_{2}O_{4}	N-butyl-N-methylpyrrolidinium difluoro(oxalato)borate (Py_{14}DFOB)						melt −5 °C	
N(-CH_{2}CH_{2}CH_{2}CH_{2}-)(CH_{2}CH_{2}CH_{2}CH_{2}CH_{3})(CH_{3})BF_{2}C_{2}O_{4}	N-pentyl-N-methylpyrrolidinium difluoro(oxalato)borate (Py_{15}DFOB)						glass transition −74 °C	
N(-CH_{2}CH_{2}CH_{2}CH_{2}-)(CH_{2}CH_{2}CH_{2}CH_{2}CH_{2}CH_{3})(CH_{3})BF_{2}C_{2}O_{4}	N-hexyl-N-methylpyrrolidinium difluoro(oxalato)borate (Py_{16}DFOB)						melt 31 °C	
	1-ethyl-1-methylpyrrolidinium difluoro(oxalato)borate						melt 10 °C; white	
	N-ethoxyethyl-N-methylpiperidinium difluoro(oxalato)borate							
	1-ethyl-3-methylimidazolium difluoro(oxalato)borate, [C_{2}mim][DFOB]							
	1-butyl-3-methylimidazolium difluoro(oxalato)borate							
	N-ethoxyethyl-N-methylpiperidinium difluoro(oxalate)borate						ionic liquid, gl;ass transition -70 °C	
	N-propyl-N-methylpiperidinium difluoro(oxalate)borate						ionic liquid	
LiBF_{2}C_{2}O_{4}	lithium difluoro(oxalato)borate	orthorhombic	Cmcm	a = 6.2623 b = 11.437 c = 6.3002 Z = 4	451.22			
LiBF_{2}C_{2}O_{4}·2H_{2}O	lithium difluoro(oxalato)borate dihydrate	monoclinic	P2_{1}/c	a = 9.5580 b = 12.7162 c = 5.4387 Z = 4	634.63			
NaBF_{2}C_{2}O_{4}	sodium difluoro(oxalato)borate	tetragonal	I4_{1}md	a=7.7316 c=8.5343	510.16			
Na(C_{2}BF_{2}O_{4})(CH_{3}CN)_{2}		orthorhombic	Pnma	a=11.6932 b = 14.1254 c = 6.5130 Z=4	1075.76		B tertrahedral coordination by 2 F and twice by -OCCO-	
Na_{3}Al(C_{2}O_{4})_{2}F_{2}.3H_{2}O							soluble	
	triethylmethylphosphonium difluoro(oxalato)borate						melt 9 °C; white	
	diethylisobutylmethylphosphonium difluoro(oxalato)borate						melt 23 °C; white	
	triisobutylmethylphosphonium difluoro(oxalato)borate							
	tributylethylphosphonium difluoro(oxalato)borate							
	lithium tetrafluoro(oxalato)phosphate (LiTFOP)						Octahedral arrangement; P-OCCO- ring	
	lithium difluorobis bis (oxalato) phosphate (LiDFBOP)						Octahedral arrangement Two F trans on P; two oxalate diligands on equator	
K_{3}Al(C_{2}O_{4})_{2}F_{2}.3H_{2}O							soluble	
[NH_{4}]_{2}VO_{2}F(C_{2}O_{4})								
[N(CH_{3})_{4}]_{2}VO_{2}F(C_{2}O_{4})								
Na_{2}VO_{2}F(C_{2}O_{4})								
K_{2}VO_{2}F(C_{2}O_{4})								
[NH_{4}][Cr(H_{2}O)_{2}F_{2}(C_{2}O_{4})]							green	
[NH_{4}]_{3}[Cr(C_{2}O_{4})_{2}F_{2}]·5H_{2}O							green	
[NH_{4}]_{3}[Cr(C_{2}O_{4})F_{4}]·4H_{2}O								
PyH[Cr(H_{2}O)_{2}F_{2}(C_{2}O_{4})] Py=pyridine							green	
enH_{2}[Cr(H_{2}O)_{2}F_{2}(C_{2}O_{4})]_{2}. 2H_{2}O en=ethylenediamine							green	
[Cr(en)(H_{2}O)_{2}(C_{2}O_{4})]_{2}F. 2H_{2}O en=ethylenediamine								
[Cr(en)_{2}(C_{2}O_{4})]_{2}F. 2H_{2}O en=ethylenediamine								
Na[Cr(H_{2}O)_{2}F_{2}(C_{2}O_{4})]. H_{2}O							green	
Na_{3}[Cr(C_{2}O_{4})_{2}F_{2}]·5H_{2}O							green	
Na_{3}[Cr(C_{2}O_{4})F_{4}]·9H_{2}O								
K[Cr(H_{2}O)_{2}F_{2}(C_{2}O_{4})]							green; 2 water and two fluorides in cis position	
K_{3}[Cr(C_{2}O_{4})_{2}F_{2}]·5H_{2}O							green	
K_{3}[Cr(C_{2}O_{4})F_{4}]·3H_{2}O								
[NH_{4}][MnF(C_{2}O_{4})]							pale pink	
[NH_{4}]_{2}Mn(C_{2}O_{4})F_{3}							pink; CAS 94138-08-6	
pyH[MnF_{2}(C_{2}O_{4})(H_{2}O)_{2}]		monoclinic	I2/a	a = 7.2260 b = 15.2398 c = 9.916 β = 98.22° Z = 4			Octahedral coordination on Mn, Cis-F opposite oxalate. 2 aqua is trans	
Na[MnF(C_{2}O_{4})]·2H_{2}O							pale pink	
Na_{2}Mn(C_{2}O_{4})F_{3}							pink; CAS 94138-06-4	
Na_{2}Mn_{2}(C_{2}O_{4})_{2.5}F·2H_{2}O		triclinic	P1̅	a = 7.9129 b = 8.8497 c = 8.9252 α = 74.623^{o} β = 72.361 ^{o} γ = 78.193 ^{o}, Z = 2			birefringence 0.064@550 nm; light yellow	
K[MnF(C_{2}O_{4})]							pale pink	
K_{2}Mn(C_{2}O_{4})F_{3}							pink; CAS 4138-07-5;	
Na_{2}Fe(C_{2}O_{4})F_{2}		monoclinic	C12/c1	a=15.8349 b=5.962 c=12.2784 β=111.968° Z=8	1075.0	2.816	green	
[NH_{4}]_{3}[Fe(C_{2}O_{4})_{2}F_{2}]·H_{2}O								
[NH_{4}][Fe(C_{2}O_{4})F_{2}]·3H_{2}O								
Na[Fe(C_{2}O_{4})F_{2}]·2H_{2}O								
Fe(phen)_{3}(BF_{4})(C_{2}O_{4}BF_{2})∙H_{2}O phen = 1,10-phenanthroline	tris(1,10-phenanthroline)-iron tetrafluoroborate [ethanedioato](difluoro)borate monohydrate	orthorhombic	Pca2_{1}	a=10.816 b=16.929 c=19.491				
(imidH)_{2}[Fe_{2}(C_{2}O_{4})F_{6}]		orthorhombic	Pban	a=9.143 b=20.837 c=3.890 Z=2			ladder, oxalate rungs	
[Fe_{2}(C_{2}O_{4})F_{4}(DMSO)_{4}]		monoclinic	P2_{1}/n	a=7.259 b=11.409 c=13.374 β=97.26° Z=2			dimer, oxalate bridged	
Na_{3}[Fe(C_{2}O_{4})_{2}F_{2}]·4H_{2}O							light green	
KFe(C_{2}O_{4})F		orthorhombic	Cmc2_{1}	a=7.7633 b=11.8767 c=10.4206			red or orange	
K[Fe(C_{2}O_{4})F_{2}]·2H_{2}O							yellowish green	
K_{2}[Fe(C_{2}O_{4})_{2}F]·3H_{2}O								
K_{3}[Fe(C_{2}O_{4})_{2}F_{2}]·2.8H_{2}O							light green	
Co(NH_{3})_{6}Al(C_{2}O_{4})_{2}F_{2}.3H_{2}O							orange yellow; insoluble	
[Co(NH_{3})_{6}][Cr(C_{2}O_{4})_{2}F_{2}]·6H_{2}O							pale green	
[Co(NH_{3})_{6}][Cr(C_{2}O_{4})F_{4}]·4H_{2}O							pale green	
[Co(NH_{3})_{6}][Cr(H_{2}O)_{2}F_{2}(C_{2}O_{4})]_{3}. 2H_{2}O							yellowish-green; sparingly soluble	
[Co(en)_{3}][Cr(C_{2}O_{4})_{2}F_{2}]·7H_{2}O							pale green	
[Co(en)_{3}][Cr(C_{2}O_{4})F4]·3H_{2}O							pale green	
[Co(en)_{3}][Cr(H_{2}O)_{2}F_{2}(C_{2}O_{4})]_{3}. 3H_{2}O							yellowish green	
[Co(NH_{3})_{6}][Fe(C_{2}O_{4})F_{2}]_{3}·6H_{2}O							orange yellow	
[Co(en)_{3}][Fe(C_{2}O_{4})F_{2}]_{3}							orange yellow	
[Co(NH_{3})_{6}]_{2}[Fe(C_{2}O_{4})_{2}F]_{3}·9H_{2}O							orange yellow	
[Co(en)_{3}]_{2}[Fe(C_{2}O_{4})_{2}F]_{3}·4H_{2}O							orange yellow	
[Co(NH_{3})_{6}][Ga(C_{2}O_{4})_{2}F_{2}].3H_{2}O							insoluble	
Ni[Cr(H_{2}O)_{2}F_{2}(C_{2}O_{4})]_{2}. 2H_{2}O							green	
Na_{2}[GeF_{2}(C_{2}O_{4})_{2}]·5.5H_{2}O								
K_{2}[GeF_{2}(C_{2}O_{4})_{2}]·1.5H_{2}O								
K_{2}Ge(C_{2}O_{4})_{2}F_{2}·2H_{2}O								
Rb_{2}VO_{2}F(C_{2}O_{4})								
Rb_{2}Ge(C_{2}O_{4})_{2}F_{2}·2H_{2}O								
Rb_{2}GeC_{2}O_{4}F_{4}								
[YF(C_{2}O_{4})(H_{2}O)_{2}]·2H_{2}O								
K_{4}Zr(C_{2}O_{4})_{3}F_{2}·3H_{2}O								
Zr_{4}O_{3}F_{2}(C_{2}O_{4})_{4} · 2H_{2}O								
K_{14}Zr_{4} (C_{2}O_{4})_{5}F_{20}·2H_{2}O								
Na_{2}ZrC_{2}O_{4}F_{4}·2H_{2}O								
Na_{2}Zr_{2}C_{2}O_{4}F_{8}·4H_{2}O								
K_{2}ZrC_{2}O_{4}F_{4}·2H_{2}O								
KZr_{2}(OH)_{3}F_{2}(C_{2}O_{4})_{2} · 4H_{2}O								
KZrF_{3}C_{2}O_{4}								
KZrF_{3}C_{2}O_{4} · 3H_{2}O								
K_{2}ZrF_{4}C_{2}O_{4}								
K_{2}ZrF_{4}C_{2}O_{4} · 2H_{2}O								
K_{3}Zr(C_{2}O_{4})_{2}F_{3}· 3H_{2}O								
K_{3}ZrF_{5}C_{2}O_{4}								
K_{4}ZrF_{2}(C_{2}O4)_{3} ⋅ 2H_{2}O								
K_{4}Zr(C_{2}O_{4})_{2}CO_{3}F_{2}·5H_{2}O								
Rb_{2}ZrC_{2}O_{4}F_{4}·2H_{2}O								
Rb_{2}Zr_{2}C_{2}O_{4}F_{8}·4H_{2}O								
Rb_{3}Zr(C_{2}O_{4})_{2}F_{3}· 3H_{2}O								
Na_{3}[NbO(C_{2}O_{4})_{2}F_{2}]·3H_{2}O								
K_{3}[NbO(C_{2}O_{4})_{2}F_{2}]·3H_{2}O								
K_{3}[Nb(C_{2}O_{4})_{3}F_{2}]·5H_{2}O								
Rb_{3}[NbO(C_{2}O_{4})_{2}F_{2}]·3H_{2}O								
Rb_{4}[Mo_{2}O_{4} (C_{2}O_{4})_{2}F_{2}]		orthorhombic		a=1065 b=8.88 c=8.09 Z=2		3.52		
In(C_{2}O_{4})F. 3H_{2}O								
NH_{4}[In(C_{2}O_{4})F_{2}].2H_{2}O								
Na[In(C_{2}O_{4})F_{2}].2H_{2}O								
K[In(C_{2}O_{4})F_{2}].3H_{2}O								
K_{2}[InF_{3}(C_{2}O_{4})H_{2}O]		monoclinic	P2_{1}/c	a=7.6943 b=9.8135 c=7.7252 β=109.648 Z=4	549.35	3.300		
Rb_{2}[InF_{3}(C_{2}O_{4})H_{2}O]		monoclinic	P2_{1}/c	a=7.8308 b=9.9671 c=7.9327 β=111.266 Z=4	576.98	3.676		
[Co(NH_{3})_{6}][In(C_{2}O_{4})_{2}F_{2}].2H_{2}O								
[Sn(C_{2}O_{4})F^{-}][NH_{4}^{+}]		monoclinic	P2_{1}/c	a = 8.2736 b = 9.6386 c = 7.7473 β = 111.229° Z = 4				
NaSnC_{2}O_{4}F·H_{2}O		triclinic	P1̅	a = 5.9880 b = 7.2468 c = 8.2925 α = 111.020°β = 107.986° γ = 96.873° Z=2	308.53	2.871	birefringence 0.189 @ 532 nm; colourless	
Na_{4}Sn_{4}(C_{2}O_{4})_{3}F_{6}		triclinic	P1̅	a = 6.0283 b = 8.7916 c = 9.1191 α = 69.486 β = 81.508 γ = 83.017	446.41	3.514	birefringence 0.160 @532 nm; colourless; Na 5 or 6 coordinated; Sn type 1: coordinates 2 F and 2 O's from oxalate, which bridges to another Sn type 1) Type 2 Sn has one bond to F, two bonds to Os from an oxalate, and another O from another oxalate. Sn also has weak bonds to other Sn	
KSn(C_{2}O_{4})F		monoclinic	P2_{1}/c	a = 8.0692 b = 9.5398 c = 7.7245 β= 111.600° Z=4	552.86	3.181	colourless	
K_{2}[SnF_{2}(C_{2}O_{4})_{2}] · 3H_{2}O								
K_{2}[SnF_{4}(C_{2}O_{4})] · 6.5H_{2}O								
K_{2}[Sn_{2}F_{2}(C_{2}O_{4})_{6}] · 2H_{2}O								
K_{6}[Sn_{2}F_{4}(C_{2}O_{4})_{5}] · 2H_{2}O								
NH_{4}Sb_{2}(C_{2}O_{4})F_{5}							birefringence 0.111 @546 nm	
NH_{4}Sb(C_{2}O_{4})F_{2}·H_{2}O							birefringence 0.381@546	
(NH_{4})_{4}Sb_{2}(C_{2}O_{4})_{3}F_{4}·2H_{2}O		monoclinic	P2_{1}/n	a= 8.6392 b=9.8051 c=11.7908 β=94.628° Z=2	995.52	2.308	birefringence 0.066 @546	
(CN_{4}H_{7})SbC_{2}O_{4}F_{2}(H_{2}O)_{0.5}							birefringence 0.126 @546 nm	
Na_{2}Sb_{2}(C_{2}O_{4})F_{6}							birefringence 0.188 @546 nm	
KSb_{2}C_{2}O_{4}F_{5}		monoclinic	P2_{1}/c	a=5.8691 b=6.5124 c=22.178 β=91.893° Z=4	847.22	3.650	birefringence 0.170 @532 nm	
K_{2}Sb_{2}(C_{2}O_{4})F_{6}							birefringence 0.097 @546 nm	
RbSb_{2}(C_{2}O_{4})F_{5}		orthorhombic	P2_{1}2_{1}2_{1}	a=5.9822 b=6.5652 c=22.7919	895.14		SHG 1.3×KDP; birefringence 0.09 @546 nm	
[C(NH_{2})_{3}]_{3}Sb(C_{2}O_{4})_{2}F_{2}·2H_{2}O		triclinic	P1̅	a=8.3223 b =11.0455 c=12.2379 α=69.660 β=76.132 γ=69.725 Z=2	980.32	1.870	birefringence 0.251@546nm	
[C(NH_{2})_{3}]Sb(C_{2}O_{4})F_{2}·H_{2}O							birefringence 0.323 @546 nm	
Cs_{2}Ge(C_{2}O_{4})_{2}F_{2}·H_{2}O								
Cs_{2}GeC_{2}O_{4}F_{4}								
Cs_{2}VO_{2}F(C_{2}O_{4})								
Cs_{2}ZrC_{2}O_{4}F_{4}·2H_{2}O								
Cs_{2}Zr_{2}C_{2}O_{4}F_{8}·4H_{2}O								
Cs_{4}[Mo_{2}O_{4} (C_{2}O_{4})_{2}F_{2}]		orthorhombic		a=10.72 b=9.80 c=7.95 Z=2		3.98		
Cs_{2}Sb_{2}(C_{2}O_{4})_{2}F_{4}∙H_{2}O							birefringence 0.325@546	
	Lanthanum fluorooxalate ??							
	Neodymium fluorooxalate ??							
[TbrF(C_{2}O_{4})(H_{2}O)_{2}]·2H_{2}O								
?[DyF(C_{2}O_{4})(H_{2}O)_{2}]·2H_{2}O	Dysprosium fluorooxalate		C2/c	a=12.0047 b=11.0842 =8.2182 β=129.021°				
[HoF(C_{2}O_{4})(H_{2}O)_{2}]·2H_{2}O	Holmium fluorooxalate							
[ErF(C_{2}O_{4})(H_{2}O)_{2}]·2H_{2}O		orthorhombic		a=11.217 b=13.046 c=9.191 Z=6				
[TmF(C_{2}O_{4})(H_{2}O)_{2}]·2H_{2}O								
[YBF(C_{2}O_{4})(H_{2}O)_{2}]·2H_{2}O								
[LuF(C_{2}O_{4})(H_{2}O)_{2}]·2H_{2}O								
K_{4}Hf(C_{2}O_{4})_{3}F_{2}·3H_{2}O								
K_{14}Hf_{4}(C_{2}O_{4})_{5}F_{20}·2H_{2}O								
K_{3}Hf(C_{2}O_{4} _{2}F_{3}· 3H_{2}O								
Rb_{3}Hf(C_{2}O_{4} _{2}F_{3}· 3H_{2}O								
K_{4}Hf(C_{2}O_{4})_{2}CO_{3}F_{2}·5H_{2}O							water soluble and stable	
H_{2}[(C_{2}O_{4})(OH)_{3}Re·O·Re(OH)_{3}F_{2}]							brown	
[NH_{4}]_{2}[(C_{2}O_{4})(OH)_{3}Re·O·Re(OH)_{3}F_{2}]							brown	
[Co(NH_{3})_{6}]_{2}[(C_{2}O_{4})(OH)_{3}Re·O·Re(OH)_{3}F_{2}]_{3}							yellowish brown	
[Co en_{3}]_{2}[(C_{2}O_{4})(OH)_{3}Re·O·Re(OH)_{3}F_{2}]_{3}							yellowish brown	
K_{2}[(C_{2}O_{4})(OH)_{3}Re·O·Re(OH)_{3}F_{2}]							brown	
Ni[(C_{2}O_{4})(OH)_{3}Re·O·Re(OH)_{3}F_{2}]							brown	
Ba[(C_{2}O_{4})(OH)_{3}Re·O·Re(OH)_{3}F_{2}]							brown	
Tl_{2}[(C_{2}O_{4})(OH)_{3}Re·O·Re(OH)_{3}F_{2}]							brown	
(UF_{2})C_{2}O_{4} · 1^{1}/2H_{2}O								
(UF)_{2}(C_{2}O_{4})_{3}								
UF_{3}(H_{2}O)(C_{2}O_{4})_{0.5}		monoclinic	C2/c	a = 17.246, b = 6.088 c = 8.589 β = 95.43° Z = 8			Light green U^{IV} tricapped trigonal prism coordination (9 fold); each U coordinates 6 bridging fluoride, one water, and two oxalates, which bridge to 3 other U atoms. One oxalate O is in the capped position, and the other 2 O are all on the common face.	
(H_{4}TREN)[U_{2}F_{6}(C_{2}O_{4})_{3}]·4H_{2}O (TREN = tris(2-aminoethyl)amine)		monoclinic	P2_{1}/c	a = 19.1563, b = 8.9531 c = 16.6221 β = 114.633° Z = 4	2591.4	2.759	green	
(H_{4}APPIP)[U_{2}F_{6}(C_{2}O_{4})_{3}]·4H_{2}O (APPIP = 1,4-bis(3-amino-propyl)piperazine)		monoclinic	P2_{1}/c	a = 10.3309 b = 15.564 c = 17.537 β = 95.430° Z=4	2807.1	2.675	green	
Na_{3}[UO_{2}(C_{2}O_{4})F_{3}]⋅4H_{2}O		orthorhombic	Pnnm	a=7.9967 b=21.092 c=7.252 Z=4	1223.2	3.020	yellow	
Na_{3}[UO_{2}(C_{2}O_{4})F_{3}]⋅6H_{2}O		triclinic		α°β°γ°				
K_{3}[UO_{2}(C_{2}O_{4})F_{3}]		triclinic	P1̅	a=9.682 b=10.274 c=10.612 α=104.008° β=97.041° γ=108.774° Z=4	946.4	3.736	yellow	
K_{3}[UO_{2}(C_{2}O_{4})_{2}F]⋅3H_{2}O		triclinic	P1̅	a=6.6530 b=9.105 c=12.120 α=96.372° β=90.714° γ=93.193° Z=2	728.4	2.902		
Cs[UO_{2}(C_{2}O_{4})F]⋅H_{2}O		monoclinic	P2_{1}	a=5.4954 b=16.226 c=9.6277 β=98.509° Z=4	849.0	4.130	yellow	
K_{2}[UO_{2}F_{2}(C_{2}O_{4})]		triclinic	P1̅	a=10.981 b=11.038 c=12.629 α=108.00° β=86.79° γ=123.99°		1.31	yellow	
K_{4}[UO_{2}F_{2}(C_{2}O_{4})_{2}]		triclinic	P1̅	a=8.768 b=8.777 c=14.857 α=101.58° β=114.27° γ=85.27°		4.16	yellow	
K_{2}[(UO_{2})_{2}F_{4}(C_{2}O_{4})]		monoclinic		a=10.792 b=12.028 c=10.615 β=136.88°		2.92	yellow; oxalate is tetradentate, bridging 2 U	
Rb_{2}[UO_{2}F_{2}(C_{2}O_{4})]							yellow	
Rb_{4}[UO_{2}F_{2}(C_{2}O_{4})_{2}]							yellow	
Rb_{2}[(UO_{2})_{2}F_{4}(C_{2}O_{4})]							yellow	

== Extra reading ==
- Komissarova L.N.; Nesterova L.A; Shatskij VM (1978). Фтороксалаты скандия, иттрия и лантана [Fuorooxalates of Scandium, Yttrium and Lanthanum]. Koordin. Khim.; SSSR; da. 1978. 4 (7): 1016–1021.
- Nesterova L.A.; Shatskii V.M.; Komissarova L.N.; Kozlovskii V.F.; Kosolapova N.Y. (1975). Синтез фтороксалата скандия [Synthesis of Scandium Fluorooxalate]. Zhurnal Neorganicheskoi Khimii. 20 (3): 812–815.
