= Oxalate chloride =

Class of chemical compounds

An oxalate chloride or oxalato chloride is a mixed anion compound contains both oxalate and chloride anions.

Related compounds include oxalate fluorides and oxalate bromides.

== Production ==
Oxalate chlorides may be produced by treating an oxalate salt with concentrated hydrochloric acid, or with a metal oxide dissolved in oxalic acid and hydrochloric acid solutions that are evaporated.

== List ==
name	formula	crystal	space group	cell	volume	density	comment	ref
Novgorodovaite	Ca_{2}(C_{2}O_{4})Cl_{2}•2H_{2}O	monoclinic	I2/m	a=6.936 b=7.382 c=7.443 β=94.3°			loses water over 205°C; refract: α=1.500 β=1.545 γ=1.568 2V=71° (−)	
	Ca_{2}(C_{2}O_{4})Cl_{2}•7H_{2}O	triclinic	P1̅	a = 7.3928 b = 8.9925 c = 10.484 α = 84.070 β = 70.95 γ = 88.545°	655.3		looses water at 25°C to 2H_{2}O; refract: α=1.571 β=1.648 γ=1.718 2V=87° (−)	
	Ca_{4}(C_{2}O_{4})_{3}Cl_{2}•8H_{2}O						dubious	
octakis(ethyl(dimethyl)ammonium) dodecakis(μ-oxalato)-tetrachloro-tetra-chromium-tetra-manganese	[NH(CH_{3})_{2}(C_{2}H_{5})]_{8}[Mn_{4}Cl_{4}Cr_{4}(C_{2}O_{4})_{12}]	monoclinic	P2_{1}	a=13.8321 b=17.1042 c=20.4209 β=91.874°				
octakis(diethyl(methyl)ammonium) dodecakis(μ-oxalato)-tetrachloro-tetra-chromium-tetra-manganese	[NH(CH_{3})(C_{2}H_{5})_{2}]_{8}[Mn_{4}Cl_{4}Cr_{4}(C_{2}O_{4})_{12}]	monoclinic	P2_{1}	a=14.1863 b=17.3479 c=20.4140 β=91.937°				
DABCO=1,4-diazabicyclo[2.2.2]octane;	(DABCO-H^{+})_{2}(DABCO-2H^{2+})[Mn^{II}(CH_{3}OH)(Cl^{−})Cr^{III}(oxalate)_{3}]^{2−}_{2}(CH_{3}OH)	triclinic	P1̅	a=8.093 b=9.070 c=19.574 α=83.471° β=89.875° γ=86.765°				
tetrakis(methylammonium) tetrakis(μ-oxalato)-octachloro-tetra-iron(iii) pentahydrate	(MeNH_{3})_{2}[Fe_{2}(ox)_{2}Cl_{4}]·2.5H_{2}O	monoclinic	P2_{1}/c	a 10.7832 b 13.913 c 13.0578 β 104.060°				
methylammonium (μ-hydroxo)-bis(μ-oxalato)-dichloro-di-iron(iii) trihydrate	MeNH_{3}[Fe_{2}(OH)(ox)_{2}Cl_{2}]·2H_{2}O	monoclinic	Cc	a=8.945 b=14.936 c=12.408 β=108.531°				
methylammonium oxonium bis(μ-oxalato)-(μ-oxo)-dichloro-di-iron(iii) dihydrate	(H_{3}O)(MeNH_{3})[Fe_{2}O(ox)_{2}Cl_{2}]·3H_{2}O	orthorhombic	Fdd2	a=14.914 b=23.507 c=9.261				
DMF = dimethylformamide	Fe_{2}(C_{2}O_{4})Cl_{4}(DMF)_{4}	triclinic	P1̅	a=8.3919 b=8.7834 c=11.2881 α=70.248° β=71.993° γ=64.423°				
	(dimim)_{2}[Fe_{2}Cl_{4}(μ-ox)]			ionic liquid				
L_{2}=1,4-bis(imidazol-1-ylmethyl)benzene bis(1,1'-(1,4-Phenylenebis(methylene))bis-1H-imidazol-3-ium) (μ_{2}-oxalato)-tetrachloro-bis(oxalato)-di-iron(iii)	(H_{2}-L_{2})_{2}{Fe_{2}(C_{2}O_{4})_{3}Cl_{4}}	triclinic	P1̅	a=10.6758 b=10.7457 c=10.8774 α=113.219° β=109.138° γ=99.294° Z=1	1020.8	1.624	emerald	
tetramelaminium trioxalatoferrate(III) chloride dihydrate	(C_{3}H_{7}N_{6})_{4}{Fe(C_{2}O_{4})_{3}}Cl·2H_{2}O	monoclinic	P2_{1}/c	a=11.597 b=22.299 c=13.655 β=94.344° Z=4	3521	1.698	green	
methylammonium (μ-aqua)-tris(μ-chloro)-(μ-oxalato)-iron(iii)-potassium	K(MeNH_{3})[Fe(ox)Cl_{3}(H_{2}O)	monoclinic	P2_{1}/m	a=8.725 b=7.508 c=9.026 β=112.421°				
diethylmethylammonium	[NH(CH_{3})(C_{2}H_{5})_{2}][FeCl_{2}(C_{2}O_{4})]	monoclinic	P2_{1}/c	a=8.5125 b=10.775 c=14.9703 β=104.798° Z=4	1327.6	1.516	yellow; proton conductor	
bis(Tetramethylammonium) bis(μ_{2}-oxalato)-tetrachloro-di-iron(iii)	Me_{4}N[Fe^{III}(ox)Cl_{2}]	monoclinic	P2_{1}/c	a=7.9441 b=8.6093 c=17.8251 β=91.869				
hexakis(Triethylammonium) hexakis(μ_{2}-oxalato)-dodecachloro-hexa-iron(iii)	Et_{3}NH[Fe^{III}(ox)Cl_{2}]	triclinic	P1̅	a=10.9609 b=14.4602 c=14.5780 α=85.006° β=78.845° γ=83.0191				
Triethylammonium (μ_{2}-oxalato)-dichloro-iron(iii)	Et_{3}NH[Fe^{III}(ox)Cl_{2}]	orthorhombic	Fdd2	a=13.5878 b=37.972 c=10.8210				
bis(Tetra-n-butylammonium) bis(μ_{2}-oxalato)-tetrachloro-di-iron(iii)	n-Bu_{4}N[Fe^{III}(ox)Cl_{2}]	monoclinic	P2_{1}/c	a=8.8836 b=15.1939 c=17.968 β=91.556°				
	[Fe(oxalato)Cl_{2}]_{3}(3,5-dimethylpyrazole)_{2}(3,5- dimethylpyrazolium)_{2}	monoclinic	C2/c	a=19.527 b=11.867 c=19.429 β=115.66° Z=4	4058.20	1.684	green	
BETS = Bis(ethylenedithio)tetraselenafulvalene	κ-BETS_{2}[Fe^{III}(C_{2}O_{4})Cl_{2}]						black; metallic;	
bis(2-(5,6-dihydro[1,3]dithiolo[4,5-b][1,4]dithiin-2-ylidene)-5,6-dihydro[1,3]dithiolo[4,5-b][1,4]dithiin-1-ium) bis(μ-oxalato)-tetrachloro-di-iron(iii)	[BEDT-TTF][Fe(C_{2}O_{4})Cl_{2}]	triclinic	P1̅	a=8.896 b=11.401 c=11.427 α=112.062° β=103.775° γ=100.328°				
BEDT-TTF = Bis(ethylenedithio)tetrathiafulvalene	(BEDT-TTF)[Fe(C_{2}O_{4})Cl_{2}](CH_{2}Cl_{2})	monoclinic	P2_{1}/c	a=8.858 b=11.012 c=14.932 β=103.39°				
tris(ethylenediamine)cobalt(III)chloride oxalate trihydrate	[Co(en)_{3}]Cl(C_{2}O_{4})·3H_{2}O	monoclinic	C2/c	a = 19.932 b = 9.3344 c = 19.088 β = 96.846° Z = 8				
dpyam=di-2-pyridylamine; (μ_{2}-Oxalato)-bis(di-2-pyridylamine)-dichloro-di-copper(ii)	Cu_{2}(dpyam)_{2}(μ-C_{2}O_{4})(Cl)_{2}	triclinic	P1̅	a=7.4122 b=8.6586 c=9.8002 α=87.900° β=72.022° γ=71.845°				
L = 3,5-dimethyl-1H-pyrazole	Cu_{2}(C_{2}O_{4})(L)_{2}Cl_{2}(MeOH)_{2}	triclinic	P1̅	a=7.244 b=8.039 c=8.848 α=92.16° β=92.73° γ=96.21°				
bpy=bipyridine	[Fe(bpy)_{3}]_{2}[NbO(C_{2}O_{4})_{3}]Cl·11H_{2}O							
	[Fe(bpy)_{3}]_{2}[NbO(_{2}O_{4})_{3}]Cl·12H_{2}O	orthorhombic	P2_{1}2_{1}2_{1}	a=14.975 b=21.708 c=22.351 Z=4	7266	1.530	dark red	
	[Co(bpy)_{3}]_{2}[NbO(C_{2}O_{4})_{3}]Cl·11H_{2}O	monoclinic	P2_{1}/c	a=23.548 b=13.631 c=22.812 β=101.04	7187	1.536	orange red	
	[Co(bpy)_{3}]_{2}[NbO(C_{2}O_{4})_{3}]Cl·12H_{2}O	orthorhombic	P2_{1}2_{1}2_{1}	a=15.103 b=22.075 c=22.386 Z=4	7463	1.495	brown	
	[Ni(bpy)_{3}]_{2}[NbO(C_{2}O_{4})_{3}]Cl·11H_{2}O	monoclinic	P2_{1}/c	a=23.875 b=13.265 c=23.115 β=101.69 Z=4	7169	1.539	pink	
	[Ni(bpy)_{3}]_{2}[NbO(C_{2}O_{4})_{3}]Cl·12H_{2}O	orthorhombic	P2_{1}2_{1}2_{1}	15.058 b=22.039 c=22.398 Z=4	7433	1.500	dark pink	
	[Cu(bpy)_{3}]_{2}[NbO(C_{2}O_{4})_{3}]Cl·12H_{2}O	orthorhombic	P2_{1}2_{1}2_{1}	a=15.035 b=22.267 c=22.538 Z=4	7545	1.487	blue	
	[Zn(bpy)_{3}]_{2}[NbO(C_{2}O_{4})_{3}]Cl·11H_{2}O	monoclinic	P2_{1}/c	24.070 b=13.332 c=23.168 β=102.19 Z=4	7267	1.530	pink	
	[Zn(bpy)_{3}]_{2}[NbO(C_{2}O_{4})_{3}]Cl·12H_{2}O							
tris(Tetraethylammonium) tetrakis(μ_{3}-sulfido)-(oxalato-O,O')-trichloro-cyano-tri-iron-molybdenum	(Et_{4}N)_{5}{[C_{2}O_{4})MoFe_{3}S_{4}Cl_{2}]_{2}(μ-CN)(μ-S)}	monoclinic	P2_{1}/n	a=10.331 b=22.580 c=19.083 β=91.97°			double cubane structure	
(μ_{2}-Oxalato)-dichloro-bis(η^{6}-p-cymene)-di-ruthenium	[Ru_{2}(μ-η^{4}-C_{2}O_{4})Cl_{2}(η^{6}-p-Pr^{i}C_{6}H_{4}Me)_{2}]	monoclinic	P2_{1}/n	a=7.571 b=8.998 c=16.528 β=95.52° Z=2	1120.73		yellow	
chloro-(oxalato)-tris(pyridine)-rhodium	mer-[Rh(C_{2}O_{4})Cl(py)_{3}]	orthorhombic	P2_{1}2_{1}2_{1}	a=9.9999 b=12.0930 c=14.9368 Z=4	1806.2	1.705	yellow	
CHLOROPENTAAMMINECHROMIUM(III) BIS(OXALATO)PALLADATE	[Cr(NH_{3})_{5}Cl][Pd(C_{2}O_{4})_{2}]	triclinic		a = 3.225 b = 10.290 c = 11.390 α = 116.5° β = 97.9° γ = 91.2°	334.5			
	C(NH_{2})_{3}Cd(C_{2}O_{4})Cl(H_{2}O)·H_{2}O	triclinic	P1̅	a=6.8136 b=7.4890 c=10.0515 α=84.082° β=77.806° γ=88.813°			band gap 3.76 eV	
	SnC_{2}O_{4}Cl_{2}							
	SnC_{2}O_{4}Cl_{2} . CuBr_{2} 1/4EtOH						green	
	SnC_{2}O_{4}Cl_{2} . CuCl_{2} . H_{2}O						green	
	SnC_{2}O_{4}Cl_{2} . CoBr2 1/8EtOH						rose colour	
	(Et_{4}N)_{2}C_{2}O_{4} . SnCl_{2}F_{2} . 2H_{2}O:						white	
	(Me_{4}N)_{2}Sn(C_{2}O_{4})Cl_{2}						white	
	(Et_{4}N)_{2}Sn(C_{2}O_{4})Cl_{2} .(Et_{4}N)_{2}C_{2}O_{4}(SnCl_{4})_{2} . EtOH						white	
	Sn(C_{2}O_{4})_{2} . 2[SnCl_{4} . (Pyridine)_{2}]						white	
	(Et_{4}N)_{2}SnCl_{6} . (Et_{4}N)_{2}C_{2}O_{4} . 2SnC_{2}O_{4}(OH)_{2}						white	
	(NH_{4})_{2}Sb(C_{2}O_{4})Cl_{3}	orthorhombic	P2_{1}2_{1}2_{1}	a=8.6961 b=8.7844 c=13.5956 Z=4	1038.57	2.253		
	K_{2}Sb(C_{2}O_{4})Cl_{3}	orthorhombic	P2_{1}2_{1}2_{1}	a=8.3966 b=8.6023 c=13,6342 Z=4	984.80	2.660		
	Rb_{2}Sb(C_{2}O_{4})Cl_{3}	orthorhombic	P2_{1}2_{1}2_{1}	a=8.6769 b=8.8485 c=13.8014 Z=4	1059.64	3.053	birefringence 0.22@546 nm;NLO 2.1 × KH_{2}PO_{4}	
	Ba_{2}Mn_{2}Cl_{2}(C_{2}O_{4})_{3}·4H_{2}O	monoclinic	C2/c	a=22.916 b=8.248 c=9.904 β=99.53°				
	Ba_{2}Fe_{2}Cl_{2}(C_{2}O_{4})_{3}·4H_{2}O	monoclinic	C2/c	a=22.798 b=8.297 c=9.849 β=99.90°				
	Ba_{2}Co_{2}Cl_{2}(C_{2}O_{4})_{3}·4H_{2}O	monoclinic	C2/c	a=22.675 b=8.230 c=9.757 β=100.00°			purple	
	BaCd(C_{2}O_{4})_{1.5}Cl(H_{2}O)_{2}	monoclinic	C2/c	a=23.101 b=8.253 c=10.040 β 99.14°			band gap 4.53 eV	
	La(C_{2}O_{4})Cl	monoclinic	P2_{1}/n	a=8.489 b=16.19 c=5.880 β=104.14°				
	La(C_{2}O_{4})Cl·3H_{2}O							
	Ce(C_{2}O_{4})Cl							
	Ce(C_{2}O_{4})Cl·3H_{2}O							
	Pr(C_{2}O_{4})Cl·3H_{2}O						stable to 163°C	
	Nd(C_{2}O_{4})Cl·3H_{2}O						stable to 167°C; dec 510° to NdOCl	
	Sm(C_{2}O_{4})Cl·3H_{2}O						stable to 174°C; dec at 347° to EuC_{2}O_{4}	
	Eu(C_{2}O_{4})Cl·3H_{2}O						stable to 178°C	
	Gd(C_{2}O_{4})Cl·3H_{2}O							
	(Et_{4}N)_{2}Sn(C_{2}O_{4})Cl_{2} . (Et_{4}N)_{2}C_{2}O_{4}(SnCl_{4})_{2} . EtOH							
	[(Me_{4}N)_{2}C_{2}O_{4}SnCl_{4}]_{2} . [(Me_{4}N)_{2}Sn(C_{2}O_{4})_{2}Cl_{2}]_{2} . Sn(WO_{4})_{2}							
	[Pt(HC_{2}O_{4})Cl_{3}]^{2−}							
	[Pt(HC_{2}O_{4})(C_{2}O_{4})Cl]^{2−}							
	K_{2}[Pt(C_{2}O_{4})Cl_{2}]·H_{2}O	triclinic	P1̅	a=7.136 b=7.308 c=10.130 α=86.75° β=74.58° γ=54.28° Z=2	457.7	3.27		
	[Pt(NH_{3})_{5}Cl][Cr(C_{2}O_{4})_{3}] · 4H_{2}O	orthorhombic	Pccn	a=38.901 b=13.7267 c=14.9141				
	[Pt(NH_{3})_{5}Cl][Fe(C_{2}O_{4})_{3}] · 4H_{2}O	orthorhombic	Pccn	a=39.0123 b=13.7232 c=14.8990				
	[Pt(NH_{3})_{5}Cl][Co(C_{2}O_{4})_{3}] · 2H_{2}O	monoclinic	P2_{1}	a=8.5158 b=12.6409 c=8.5726 β=105.000°				
lead chloride oxalate	Pb_{2}Cl_{2}(C_{2}O_{4})	monoclinic	C2/m	a=5.9411 b=5.8714 c=9.4212 β=95.232° Z=2	327.26	5.82	dec 350°C to Pb, Pb_{5}O_{2}Cl_{6} and Pb_{3}O_{2}Cl_{2}	
	Th_{4}Cl_{4}(C_{2}O_{4})_{6}•20H_{2}O							
Plutonium(III) oxalato chloride	?Pu(C_{2}O_{4})Cl·3H_{2}O						blue; biaxial (−)	
	Am(C_{2}O_{4})Cl·3H_{2}O	monoclinic	P2_{1}/n	a=5.852 b=15.823 c=8.351 β=104.243°				
