= Oxalate phosphite =

Class of chemical compounds

The oxalate phosphites are chemical compounds containing oxalate and phosphite anions. They are also called oxalatophosphites or phosphite oxalates. Oxalate phosphates can form metal organic framework compounds.

Related compounds include the nitrite oxalates, arsenite oxalates, phosphate oxalates and oxalatophosphonates.

The oxalate ion is rectangular and planar. The phosphite ion is shaped as a triangular pyramid. Because of high charge and stiff shape they will bridge across more than one cation, in particular those hard cations with a higher charge such as +3. Hydrogen can convert some of the oxygen on the anions to OH and reduce the charge. Many oxalate phosphite compounds have microporous structures where amines direct the structure formation.

== List ==
| name | chem | crystal system | space group | unit cell Å | volume | density | comment | references |
|---|---|---|---|---|---|---|---|---|
| N,N′-dimethylpiperazine | [Mg(H_{2}PO_{3})_{2}(C_{2}O_{4})_{0.5}](C_{6}N_{2}H_{16})_{0.5} | monoclinic | P2_{1}/n | a=9.1064 b=8.6820 c=14.0425 β=102.561° Z=4 | 1083.65 | 1.768 | proton conductor | |
| ethane-1,2-bis(ammonium) bis(μ-hydrogen phosphonato)-oxalato-magnesium | | monoclinic | P2_{1} | a=7.3313 b=9.0913 c=8.7803 β=93.714° | | | | |
| N^{1},N^{1},N^{3},N^{3}-tetramethylpropane-1,3-bis(ammonium) bis(μ-hydrogen phosphonato)-bis(μ-oxalato)-di-magnesium monohydrate | | triclinic | P1 | a=8.2680 b=8.8920 c=9.5432 α=110.668° β=104.445° γ=107.384° | | | | |
| (bis(dimethylammonium) 1,4-dimethylpiperazine-1,4-di-ium bis(bis(μ-oxalato)-(μ-hydrogen phosphito)-aqua-di-magnesium) dihydrate) | [Mg_{2}(H_{2}O)(HPO_{3})(C_{2}O_{4})_{2}](C_{6}N_{2}H_{16})_{0.5}·(C_{2}NH_{8})·H_{2}O | monoclinic | P2_{1}/c | a=9.0231 b=13.0696 c=15.691 β=102.615° | | | proton conductor | |
| peha = pentaethylenehexamine | [(H_{6}peha)_{0.17}(H_{2}O)_{1.5}][Al_{2}(HPO_{3})_{2}(C_{2}O_{4})(HCOO)] | | | | | | +formate | |
| | (H_{13}C_{5}NOH)_{0.5}(H_{2}C_{13}H_{14}N_{2})_{0.25}[Al_{2}(HPO_{3})_{2}(C_{2}O_{4})(OH)(H_{2}O)]0.5H_{2}O | | | | | | | |
| piperazine-1,4-diium (μ-hydrogen phosphato)-(ethanedioato)-oxido-vanadium monohydrate | V_{2}O_{2}(HPO_{4})(HPO_{3})(C_{2}O_{4})_{2}·(C_{4}N_{2}H_{12})_{2}·2H_{2}O | monoclinic | P2_{1}/n | a=12.5398 b=6.4390 c=15.4038 β=107.251° | | | proton conductor | |
| | Li_{2}(VOHPO_{3})_{2}C_{2}O_{4}•6H_{2}O | triclinic | P1̅ | a=6.3592, b=8.0789, c=9.1692, α=64.390°, β=87.277°, γ=67.624° | | | | |
| | Li_{2}(VOHPO_{3})_{2}C_{2}O_{4}•4H_{2}O | monoclinic | P2_{1}/a | a=6.3555 b=12.6368 c=9.0242 β=105.167° | | | | |
| | Li_{2}(VO)_{2}(HPO_{3})_{2}C_{2}O_{4} | | | | | | | |
| diammonium (μ-oxalato)-bis(μ-phosphonato)-dioxo-di-vanadium hydrate | (NH_{4})_{2}(VOHPO_{3})_{2}C_{2}O_{4} 2·9H_{2}O | triclinic | P1̅ | a = 6.3844, b = 7.2278, c = 9.2965, α = 67.260°, β = 72.927°, γ = 85.848° | | | | |
| (μ_{6}-Oxalato)-bis(μ_{4}-hydrogen phosphonato)-bis(μ_{2}-aqua)-bis(μ_{2}-oxo)-di-sodium-di-vanadium | Na_{2}(VO)_{2}(HPO_{3})_{2}C_{2}O_{4} | triclinic | P1̅ | a 6.3255 b 6.7760 c 8.0759, α 104.992° β 101.679° γ 99.120° Z=1 | 319.20 | 2.413 | blue | |
| | Na₂[(VO)₂(HPO₃)₂(C₂O₄)]·2H₂O | | | | | | | |
| | K_{2}(VO)_{2}(HPO_{3})_{2}C_{2}O_{4} | monoclinic | C2/c | a 17.75 b 6.370 c 13.977, β 115.42° Z=4 | 1427 | 2.393 | blue | |
| tetrakis(Guanidinium) (μ_{4}-oxalato)-bis(μ_{3}-hydrogen phosphito)-tetrakis(μ_{2}-oxalato)-diaqua-penta-manganese dihydrate | (CN_{3}H_{6})_{2}·Mn_{2.5}(HPO_{3})(C_{2}O_{4})_{2.5}(H_{2}O)·H_{2}O | triclinic | P1̅ | a=9.7205 b=9.7468 c=10.8926 α=83.989° β=75.467° γ=78.545° | | | | |
| piperazine | [C_{4}N_{2}H_{12}][Mn^{II}_{2}(HPO_{3})_{2}(C_{2}O_{4})] | monoclinic | P2_{1}/c | a=6.0627 b=10.7122 c=10.387 β=97.956 Z=2 | 668.1 | 2.217 | pale pink | |
| dab = 1,4-diaminobutane | H_{2}dab·Mn_{2}(HPO_{3})_{2}(C_{2}O_{4})(H_{2}O)_{2} | monoclinic | P2_{1}/n | a = 5.616, b = 15.431, c = 9.445, β = 91.72(2)°, Z = 2 | 818.2 | | | |
| ethylenediammonium manganese phosphite-oxalate | [C_{2}N_{2}H_{10}][Mn_{2}^{II}(OH_{2})_{2}(HPO_{3})_{2}(C_{2}O_{4})] | monoclinic | P2_{1}/c | a 7.837 b 8.755 c 10.100, β 100.605° | | | | |
| bis(1-(3-ammoniopropyl)imidazolium) tetrakis(μ-dihydrogen phosphato)-tetrakis(μ-oxalato)-tetra-manganes | H_{2}api·Mn_{2}(H_{2}PO_{4})_{2}(C_{2}O_{4})_{2} | triclinic | P1̅ | a=7.6108 b=9.8476 c=15.2437, α=100.023° β=102.032° γ=110.612° | | | | |
| N,N′-dimethylpiperazine (Me_{2}ppz) | [Mn(H_{2}PO_{3})(C_{2}O_{4})](H_{2}Me_{2}ppz)_{0.5}·H_{2}O | monoclinic | P2_{1}/n | a= 9.3396 b= 13.3332 c=9.6168 β=109.495° Z=4 | 1128.89 | 1.765 | proton conductor | |
| | (C_{6}H_{14}N_{2})_{0.5}Mn(H_{2}PO_{3})(C_{2}O_{4}) | | | | | | | |
| N,N′-dimethylpiperazine (Me_{2}ppz) | [Mn_{2}Cl(H_{2}O)(H_{2}PO_{3})_{2}(C_{2}O_{4})_{1.5}](H_{2}Me_{2}ppz) | triclinic | P1̅ | a=7.4564 b=11.114 c=13.0787 α=92.767° β=99.906° γ=107.304° Z=2 | 1013.7 | 1.879 | | |
| | K_{2}Mn^{II}_{2}(H_{2}O)_{2}C_{2}O_{4}(HPO_{3})_{2} | hexagonal | P6_{3}/m | a=9.7371 c=22.4924 | 1846.8 | 2.547 | pink | |
| | [C_{6}N_{2}H_{14}]_{2}[Fe^{III}_{2}F_{2}(HPO_{3})_{2}(C_{2}O_{4})_{2} | | | | | | | |
| 1,4-diazabicyclo[2.2.2]octane (DABCO) | [C_{6}N_{2}H_{14}]_{2}[Fe^{III}_{2}F_{2}(HPO_{3})_{2}(C_{2}O_{4})_{2}]·2H_{2}O | monoclinic | P2_{1}/n | a=12.51 b=6.372 c=33.153 β=90.532 Z=4 | 2643.0 | 1.875 | colourless; chains | |
| TREN | [C_{6}N_{4}H_{21}]_{2}[Fe^{II}_{4}(HPO_{3})_{2}(C_{2}O_{4})_{5}]·5H_{2}O | triclinic | P1̅ | a=8.719 b=8.827 c=15.908 α=78.617 β=84.047 γ=68.241 Z=2 | 1114.1 | 1.770 | brown; network | |
| | [Fe^{III}_{2}(OH_{2})_{2}(HPO_{3})_{2}(C_{2}O_{4})]·H_{2}O | monoclinic | P2_{1}/c | a=4.875 b=17.707 c=6.984 β=106.728 Z=4 | 577.46 | 2.368 | colourless | |
| ethylenediammonium | [C_{2}N_{2}H_{10}][Fe^{II}_{2}(OH_{2})_{2}(HPO_{3})_{2}(C_{2}O_{4})] | monoclinic | P2_{1}/c | a=7.684 b=8.651 c=10.053 β=100.821 Z=4 | 653.6 | 2.317 | brown | |
| BAPEN | [C_{8}N_{4}H_{26}][Fe^{III}_{6}(HPO_{3})_{8}(C_{2}O_{4})_{3}]·4H_{2}O | monoclinic | P2_{1}/n | a=8.493 b=16.685 c=16.215 β=95.919 Z=4 | 2280.35 | 2.157 | colourless | |
| homopip | [C_{5}N_{2}H_{14}][Fe^{II}_{4}(HPO_{3})_{2}(C_{2}O_{4})_{3}] | monoclinic | P2_{1}/c | a=7.682 b=7.726 c=18.092 β=94.443 Z=4 | 1070.8 | 2.004 | brown | |
| Piperazinediium bis(μ_{4}-phosphito)-(μ_{4}-oxalato)-bis(μ_{3}-oxalato)-tetra-iron(ii) | [C_{4}N_{2}H_{12}][Fe^{II}_{4}(HPO_{3})_{2}(C_{2}O_{4})_{3}] | monoclinic | P2_{1}/c | a 7.7286 b 7.587 c 17.9816 β 98.214° | | | | |
| bis(2,6-dimethylpiperazine-1,4-diium) tris(μ-oxalato)-bis(hydrogen phosphonato)-di-cobalt | Co_{2}(H_{2}PO_{3})_{2}(C_{2}O_{4})_{3}(C_{6}N_{2}H_{16})_{2} | monoclinic | P2_{1}/c | a=5.8605 b=13.6144 c=19.360 β=105.582° | | | 1D | |
| tetrakis(dimethylammonium) tetrakis(μ-hydroxyphosphaniumbis(olato))-tetrakis(oxalato)-tetra-cobalt(ii) | Co(H_{2}PO_{3})(C_{2}O_{4})·(C_{2}H_{8}N) | triclinic | P1̅ | a=8.6454 b=9.6156 c=12.7507 α=69.318° β=82.346° γ=74.616° | | | | |
| bis(dimethylammonium) bis(μ-hydroxyphosphaniumbis(olato))-bis(μ-oxalato)-di-cobalt(ii) | Co(H_{2}PO_{3})(C_{2}O_{4})·(C_{2}H_{8}N) | monoclinic | P2_{1}/n | a=9.5434 b=7.3028 c=14.2274 β=104.395° | | | | |
| dab = 1,4-diaminobutane | (H_{2}dab)_{0.5}·Co(H_{2}PO_{3})(C_{2}O_{4}) | | | | | | | |
| | [C_{4}N_{2}H_{12}][Co_{4}(HPO_{3})_{2}(C_{2}O_{4})_{3}] | monoclinic | P2_{1}/c | a=7.614 b=7.51 c=17.750 β=97.351 Z=2 | 1007.3 | 2.466 | | |
| bis(Guanidinium) bis(μ_{2}-hydrogen phosphito)-bis(μ_{2}-oxalato)-di-cobalt | CN_{3}H_{6}·Co(H_{2}PO_{3})(C_{2}O_{4}) | monoclinic | P2_{1}/n | a=8.8749 b=7.4104 c=15.2333 β=102.172° | | | | |
| | Co(H_{2}PO_{3})(C_{2}O_{4})·(C_{2}H_{8}N) | triclinic | P1̅ | | | | | |
| | Co(H_{2}PO_{3})(C_{2}O_{4})·(C_{2}H_{8}N) | monoclinic | P2_{1}/n | | | | | |
| | Co_{2}(H_{2}PO_{3})_{2}(C_{2}O_{4})_{3}(C_{6}N_{2}H_{16})_{2} | monoclinic | P2_{1}/c | a=5.8605 b=13.6144 c=19.361 β=105.582 | 1487.9 | 1.733 | pink | |
| | Co_{2}(H_{2}PO_{3})_{2}(C_{2}O_{4})_{2}(C_{6}N_{2}H_{16}) | monoclinic | P2_{1}/c | a=15.3007 b=8.2832 c=16.2601 β=113.487 Z=2 | 1890 | 2.010 | pink; proton conductor | |
| | (C_{4}H_{14}N_{2})_{0.5}Co(HPO_{3})(C_{2}O_{4}) | | | | | | | |
| N, N-dimethyl-piperazine | [Ga_{2}(HPO_{3})_{2}(H_{2}PO_{3})_{2}(C_{2}O_{4})](C_{6}N_{2}H_{16}) | monoclinic | P2_{1}/c | a=10.183 b=12.525 c=16.295 β=98.218° | | | | |
| N, N-dimethyl-piperazine | [Ga_{2}(HPO_{3})_{2}(H_{2}PO_{3})(C_{2}O_{4})](C_{6}N_{2}H_{16})_{0.5} | monoclinic | C2/c | a=23.462 b=8.1170 c=16.898 β=112.873° | | | | |
| N-(3-aminopropyl)morpholine | [H_{2}apm][Ga_{2}(H_{2}PO_{3})_{2}(HPO_{3})_{2}(C_{2}O_{4})] | orthorhombic | Pbcm | a=8.569 b=20.245 c=12.604 | | | | |
| bis(1,4-Diazoniabicyclo[2.2.2]octane) bis(μ_{3}-hydrogen phosphito)-dihydroxy-bis(oxalato)-di-gallium(iii) dihydrate | (C_{6}N_{2}H_{14})_{2}[Ga_{2}(OH)_{2}(C_{2}O_{4})_{2}(HPO_{3})_{2}]·2H_{2}O | monoclinic | P2_{1}/n | a 12.401 b 6.283 c 33.306 β 91.197° | | | | |
| N,N,N',N'-Tetramethylethylenediammonium bis(μ_{3}-hydrogen phosphito)-(μ_{2}-oxalato)-dihydroxy-di-gallium(iii) | (C_{6}N_{2}H_{18})_{0.5}[Ga(OH)(C_{2}O_{4})_{0.5}(HPO_{3})] | triclinic | P1̅ | a 6.257 b 8.558 c 9.253, α 93.219° β 108.265° γ 106.956° | | | | |
| bis(μ_{3}-Hydrogen phosphito)-(μ_{2}-oxalato)-bis(1H-imidazole)-di-gallium(iii) | Ga(C_{2}O_{4})_{0.5}(C_{3}N_{2}H_{4})(HPO_{3}) | monoclinic | P2_{1}/c | a 8.038 b 8.709 c 11.487, β 91.85° | | | | |
| | Ga(HPO_{3})(C_{2}O_{4})(C_{3}N_{2}H_{4})·(C_{3}N_{2}H_{5}) | orthorhombic | Pnma | a=13.288, b=6.361, c=1.5364, Z=4 | | | | |
| [bis(1,4-dimethylpiperazinediium) tetrakis(μ_{2}-phosphito)-tetrakis(μ_{2}-hydrogen phosphito)-bis(μ_{2}-oxalato)-tetra-gallium] | [Ga_{2}(HPO_{3})_{2}(H_{2}PO_{3})_{2}(C_{2}O_{4})](C_{6}N_{2}H_{16}) | monoclinic | P2_{1}/c | a =10.183 b=12.525 c=16.295 β=98.218° | | | | |
| [hemikis(1,4-dimethylpiperazinediium) bis(μ_{3}-phosphito)-(μ_{2}-hydrogen phosphito)-(μ_{2}-oxalato)-di-gallium] | [Ga_{2}(HPO_{3})_{2}(H_{2}PO_{3})(C_{2}O_{4})](C_{6}N_{2}H_{16})_{0.5} | monoclinic | C 2/c | a =23.462 b= 8.1170 c =16.898, β 112.873° | | | | |
| phen = 1,10-phenanthroline | Cd_{2}(phen)_{2}(H_{2}PO_{4})(H_{2}PO_{3})(C_{2}O_{4}) | | | | | | chains | |
| | Cd(C_{10}H_{8}N_{2})(HPO_{3})(C_{2}O_{4})_{0.5} | | | | | | | |
| catena-(Piperazinedi-ium bis(μ_{3}-hydrogen phosphito)-(μ_{2}-oxalato)-(μ_{2}-hydrogen phosphito)-di-indium) | [C_{4}H_{12}N_{2}][In_{2}(HPO_{3})_{3}(C_{2}O_{4})] | orthorhombic | Cmcm | a=6.555 b=15.384 c=18.135 | | | | |
| | [C_{4}N_{2}H_{12}]_{3}[In_{2}(HPO_{3})_{2}(C_{2}O_{4})_{4}].4H_{2}O | | | | | | | |
| tetrakis(μ-phosphonato)-tris(μ-oxalato)-bis(2-azaniumyl-3-(1H-imidazol-3-ium-5-yl)propanoato)-tetra-indium monohydrate | In_{2}(C_{6}H_{10}N_{3}O_{2})(HPO_{3})_{2}(C_{2}O_{4})_{1.5}·0.5H_{2}O | triclinic | P1̅ | a=8.7050 b=10.4508 c=12.1060 α=107.888° β=103.691° γ=104.046° | | | | |
| 5-(2-azaniumyl-2-carboxyethyl)-1H-imidazol-3-ium pentakis(μ-phosphonato)-(μ-hydrogen phosphonato)-bis(μ-oxalato)-(2-azaniumyl-3-(1H-imidazol-3-ium-5-yl)propanoato)-tetra-indium | (C_{6}H_{11}N_{3}O_{2})·[In_{4}(C_{6}H_{10}N_{3}O_{2})(HPO_{3})_{5}(H_{2}PO_{3})(C_{2}O_{4})_{2}] | monoclinic | P2_{1} | a=8.3970 b=23.4886 c=9.9675 β=108.292° | | | | |
| 1,4-diazabicyclo[2.2.2]octane (dabco) | C_{6}H_{14}N_{2}[In_{2}(HPO_{3})_{3}(C_{2}O_{4})] | orthorhombic | Pna2_{1} | a = 12.414, b = 7.7166, c = 18.327, Z = 4 | 1755.6 | 2.542 | | |
| | [C_{4}N_{2}H_{12}]_{2}[In_{2}(HPO_{3})_{3}(C_{2}O_{4})_{2}].3H_{2}O | | | | | | | |
| | [C_{4}N_{2}H_{12}]_{3}[In_{4}(HPO_{3})_{6}(C_{2}O_{4})_{3}] | | | | | | | |
| | [C_{4}N_{2}H_{14}][In_{4}(H_{2}O)(HPO_{3})_{5}(C_{2}O_{4})_{2}].2H_{2}O | | | | | | | |
| | H[In_{5}(HPO_{3})_{6}(H_{2}PO_{3})_{2}(C_{2}O_{4})_{2}]·(C_{4}N_{2}H_{11})_{2}·H_{2}O | triclinic | P1̅ | a =7.822 b =10.626 c =13.156, α =94.720° β =92.336° γ =110.181° | | | | |
| 1-methylpiperazine | In_{5}(HPO_{3})_{6}(H_{1.5}PO_{3})_{2}(C_{2}O_{4})_{2}·(H_{2}C_{5}N_{2}H_{12})_{2} | triclinic | P1̅ | a 10.1574 b 10.4440 c 10.6857, α 70.006° β 76.100° γ 79.337° | | | proton conductor | |
| 1-ethylpiperazine | In_{5}(HPO_{3})_{6}(H_{1.5}PO_{3})_{2}(C_{2}O_{4})_{2}·(H_{2}C_{6}N_{2}H_{14})_{2} | triclinic | P1̅ | a 10.1904 b 10.4327 c 10.7158, α 69.373° β 77.185° γ 79.268° | | | | |
| dbu = 1,8-diazabicyclo[5.4.0]undec-7-ene | Hdbu·In_{2}(HPO_{3})_{2}(C_{2}O_{4})_{1.5} | triclinic | P1̅ | a=9.5647 b=9.5781 c=12.1268 α=91.514° β=103.535° γ=112.440° | | | | |
| | SbHPO_{3}F | monoclinic | P2_{1}/c | a=4.5655 b=13.1125 c=6.7048 β=98.650° Z=4 | 396.82 | 3.695 | | |
| | Ba_{2}(C_{2}O_{4})(H_{2}PO_{3})_{2} | monoclinic | C2/c | a = 12.3829, b = 7.9124, c = 11.0858, β=114.788 (2)°, Z = 4 | 986.10 | 3.534 | colourless | |
| ethylenediammonium | C_{2}H_{10}N_{2}·Ba(H_{2}O)_{2}(HC_{2}O_{4})_{4} | monoclinic | C2/m | a = 12.7393 b = 13.0111 c = 5.6050 β = 104.208 ° Z=2 | 900.62 | | | |
| 1-ethylpiperazine | [Ce_{2}(H_{2}PO_{3})(C_{2}O_{4})_{4}](C_{6}N_{2}H_{16})·H_{3}O·3H_{2}O | orthorhombic | P2_{1}2_{1}2_{1} | a=12.168 b=13.404 c=16.611 | | | proton conductor | |
| L-histidine | Ce_{2}(H_{2}O)_{2}(H_{2}PO_{3})_{2}(C_{2}O_{4})_{3}·C_{6}H_{11}N_{3}O_{2}·H_{2}O | monoclinic | P2_{1}/c | a= 10.22 b=29.41 c=8.778 β=101.46° Z=4 | 2587 | 2.351 | | |
| | [Pr(H_{2}O)(C_{2}O_{4})_{0.5}(HPO_{3})]·H_{2}O | triclinic | P1̅ | a=6.6764 b=7.0684 c=7.8103 α=111.141° β=95.415° γ=90.457° Z=2 | | 2.923 | | |
| | [Nd(H_{2}O)(C_{2}O_{4})_{0.5}(HPO_{3})]·H_{2}O | triclinic | P1̅ | a=6.6544 b=7.0684 c=7.8103 α=111.160° β=95.307° γ=90.590° Z=2 | | 2.985 | | |
| | [Sm(H_{2}O)(C_{2}O_{4})_{0.5}(HPO_{3})]·H_{2}O | | | | | | | |
| | [Eu(H_{2}O)(C_{2}O_{4})_{0.5}(HPO_{3})]·H_{2}O | triclinic | P1̅ | a=6.5619 b=6.9442 c=7.7412 α=111.369° β=95.495° γ=90.824° Z=2 | | 3.173 | | |
| | [Gd(H_{2}O)(C_{2}O_{4})_{0.5}(HPO_{3})]·H_{2}O | triclinic | P1̅ | a=6.5434 b=6.9311 c=7.7465 α=111.487° β=95.645° γ=90.833° Z=2 | | 3.244 | | |
| | [Ho(H_{2}O)(C_{2}O_{4})_{0.5}(HPO_{3})]·H_{2}O | triclinic | P1̅ | a=6.4628 b=6.8519 c=7.6936 α=111.646° β=95.779° γ=91.028° Z=2 | | 3.421 | | |
| | [Er(H_{2}O)(C_{2}O_{4})_{0.5}(HPO_{3})]·H_{2}O | triclinic | P1̅ | a=6.4400 b=6.8326 c=7.6747 α=111.654° β=95.757° γ=91.096° Z=2 | | 3.487 | | |
| | [Tm(H_{2}O)(C_{2}O_{4})_{0.5}(HPO_{3})]·H_{2}O | triclinic | P1̅ | | | | | |
| | [Yb(H_{2}O)(C_{2}O_{4})_{0.5}(HPO_{3})]·H_{2}O | triclinic | P1̅ | a=6.4075 b=6.8050 c=7.6647 α=111.753° β=95.858° γ=91.204° Z=2 | | 3.589 | | |
| | [Lu(H_{2}O)(C_{2}O_{4})_{0.5}(HPO_{3})]·H_{2}O | triclinic | P1̅ | | | | | |
