= Lithium bis(oxalato)borate =

Names
- Other names LiBOB

Identifiers
CAS Number	244761-29-3
3D model (JSmol)	Interactive image
ChemSpider	9450561
ECHA InfoCard	100.104.534
EC Number	456-990-3
PubChem CID	23677815
CompTox Dashboard (EPA)	DTXSID90893463
- InChI: InChI=1S/C4BO8.Li/c6-1-2(7)11-5(10-1)12-3(8)4(9)13-5;/q-1;+1 Key: NVQAYVUCVASGDK-UHFFFAOYSA-N
- SMILES: [Li+].[B-]12(OC(=O)C(=O)O1)OC(=O)C(=O)O2

Properties
Chemical formula	C_{4}BLiO_{8}
Molar mass	193.79 g·mol^{−1}
Appearance	white solid
Density	2.021 g/cm^{3}
- Except where otherwise noted, data are given for materials in their standard state (at 25 °C [77 °F], 100 kPa). Infobox references

Lithium bis(oxalate)borate is the inorganic compound with the formula LiB(C_{2}O_{4})_{2}. A white solid, it is used as an electrolyte in some lithium batteries. It is one of several borate oxalates.

According to X-ray crystallography, solid LiBOB consists of tetrahedral B(C_{2}O_{4})^{−}_{2} anions linked by Li^{+} cations.
