= Oxalatoborates =

Chemical compounds containing oxalate-boron complexes

Boro-oxalates, bis(oxalato)borates, or oxalatoborates are chemical compounds where an oxalate group is bound to a borate group via oxygen, forming a condensed anion. The oxalatoborates are heterocyclic compounds with a ring containing -O-B-O-C-C-. Bis(oxalato)borates are spiro compounds with two rings joined at the boron atom.

Oxalatoborates are used for research in lithium-ion battery electrolytes and for supercapacitors.

The borate oxalates are chemical compounds containing separate borate and oxalate anions. Compared to oxalatoborates, these are of little importance.

== Production ==
Oxalatoborates have been produced by heating boric acid, oxalic acid and a metal oxalate, a metal carbonate or an amine in boiling benzene with continuous removal of water via azeotropic distillation.

== Properties ==
When heated, oxalatoborates decompose at around 320 °C to yield a metaborate, carbon monoxide, and carbon dioxide.

== List ==
Name	Chemical formula	Molecular weight	Crystal system	Space group	Unit cell (Å)	Volume	Density	Comments	References
Lithium bis(oxalate)borate, LiBOB	LiB(C_{2}O_{4})_{2}	193.8	orthorhombic	Pnma	a 6.3635 b 7.5998 c 13.1715				
lithium difluoro (oxalate) borate, LiDFOB	LiBF_{2}(C_{2}O_{4})	143.8	orthorhombic	Cmcm	a = 6.2623, b = 11.437, c = 6.3002, Z = 4	451.22			
lithium difluoro (oxalate) borate dihydrate	LiBF_{2}(C_{2}O_{4})•2H_{2}O		monoclinic	P21/c	a = 9.5580, b = 12.7162, c = 5.4387, β =106.247 Z = 4	634.63			
ammonium bis(oxalato)borate									
tetramethylammonium bis(oxalato)borate	N(CH_{3})_{4}B(C_{2}O_{4})_{2}								
triethylammonium bis(oxalato)borate									
pyridinium bis(oxalato)borate									
quinolinium bis(oxalato)borate									
1-ethyl-3-methylimidazolium bis(oxalate)borate (EmimBOB)								ionic liquid	
1-Butyl-1-Methylpyrrolidinium bis(oxalate)borate; Bmpyr BOB	(C_{4}H_{8}N^{+})(CH_{3})(C_{4}H_{10})[B(C_{2}O_{4})_{2}]^{−}							ionic liquid	
	[(C_{2}H_{5})_{4}N][CF_{3}B(OCH_{3})(C_{2}O_{4})]								
	[(C_{2}H_{5})_{4}N][CF_{3}CF_{2}B(OCH_{3})(C_{2}O_{4})]								
	[(C_{2}H_{5})_{4}N][CF_{3}BF(C_{2}O_{4})]								
	[(C_{2}H_{5})_{4}N][CF_{3}CF_{2}BF(C_{2}O_{4})]								
sodium bis(oxalato)borate, NaBOB	NaB(C_{2}O_{4})_{2}		orthorhombic	Cmcm	a 8.12756( b 10.3399 c 7.8211				
Trihexyltetradecylphosphonium bis(oxalate)borate									
	[(C_{6}H_{5})_{4}P][CF_{3}B(OCH_{3})(C_{2}O_{4})]	538.24	triclinic	P1̅	a 11.0744 b 11.5314 c 12.2196, α 73.427° β 69.395° γ 61.786° Z=2	1273.7	1.403		
	[(C_{6}H_{5})_{4}P][CF_{3}CF_{2}B(OCH_{3})(C_{2}O_{4})]								
	[(C_{6}H_{5})_{4}P][CF_{3}BF(C_{2}O_{4})]								
	[(C_{6}H_{5})_{4}P][CF_{3}CF_{2}BF(C_{2}O_{4})]	576.22	monoclinic	C2/c	a 16.821 b 7.1612 c 21.519 β 101.981° Z=4	2535.6	1.509		
Lithium difluoro(oxalato)borate tetramethylene sulfone disolvate	Li^{+}•C_{2}BF_{2}O_{4}^{−}•2C_{4}H_{8}O_{2}S		monoclinic	P2_{1}/n	a = 13.9005 b = 5.8917 c = 19.9627 β = 106.010 Z=4	1571.48	1.623	colourless	
rubidium bis(oxalato)borate									
caesium bis(oxalato)borate									
thallium bis(oxalato)borate									
Borate oxalates
potassium boro-oxalate	K(C_{2}O_{4})(BO_{2})_{2}•2H_{2}O	248.77	triclinic	P1	a=6.3508 b=7.0095 c=10.590 α=93.798 β=101.424 γ=100.196	452.3	1.827	NLO 1.56×KDP; stable to 187 °C	
	Pb_{6}O_{2}(BO_{3})_{2}(C_{2}O_{4})	740.39	orthorhombic	Cmcm	a=18.0445 b=6.6225 c=11.4682 Z=8	1370.45	7.177	band gap 3.60 eV	
