= Oxalate phosphate =

Chemical compound containing oxalate and phosphate anions

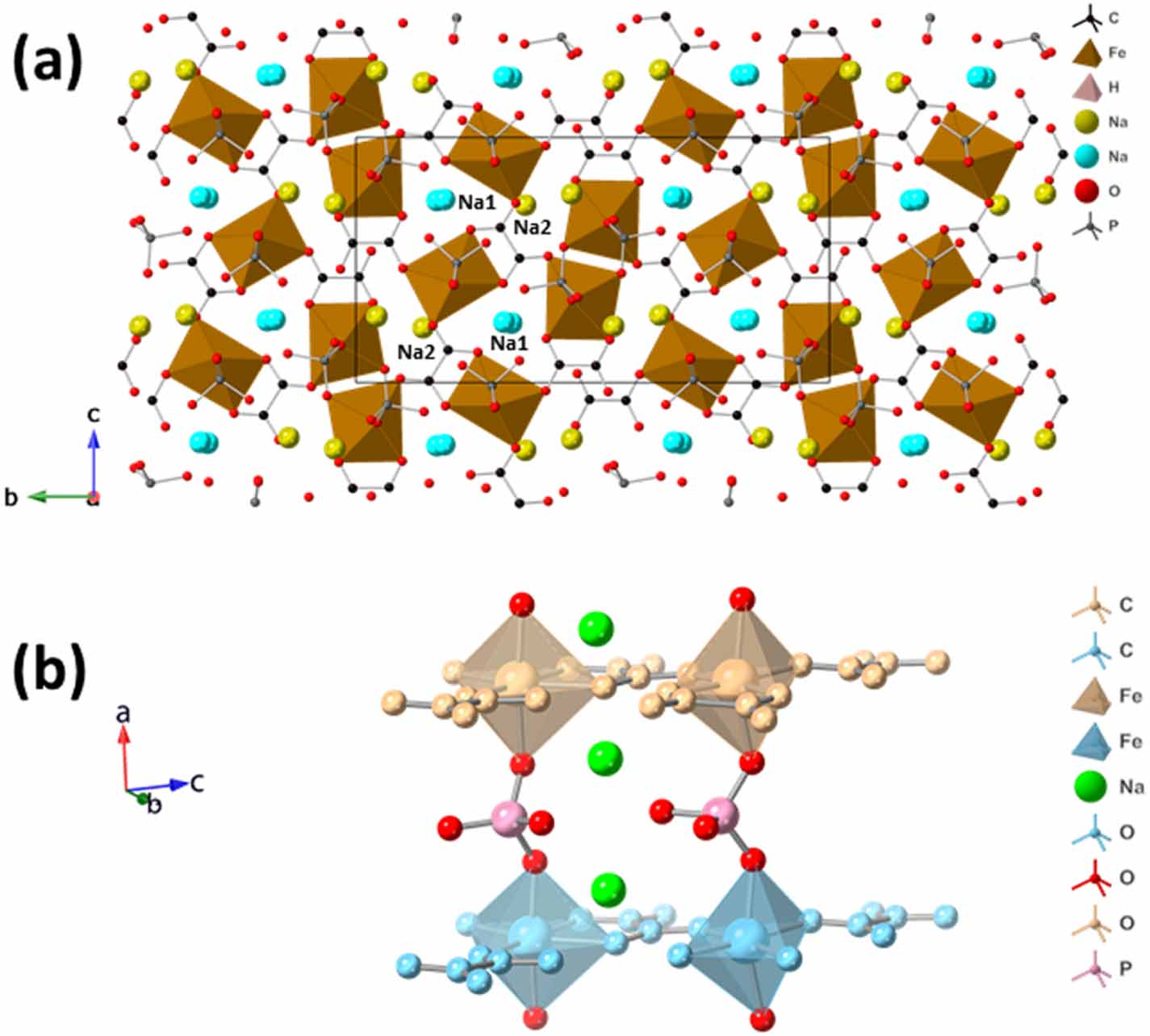
Na_{2}Fe(C_{2}O_{4})(HPO_{4}) crystal structure

The oxalate phosphates are chemical compounds containing oxalate and phosphate anions. They are also called oxalatophosphates or phosphate oxalates. Some oxalate-phosphate minerals found in bat guano deposits are known. Oxalate phosphates can form metal organic framework compounds.

Related compounds include the arsenate oxalates, and phosphite oxalates, oxalatomethylphosphonate, and potentially other oxalate phosphonates.

== List ==
name	chem	mw	crystal system	space group	unit cell Å	volume	density	comment	references
Phoxite	(NH_{4})_{2}Mg_{2}(C_{2}O_{4})(PO_{3}OH)_{2}(H_{2}O)_{4}		monoclinic	P2_{1}/c	a=7.2962 b=13.5993 c=7.8334 β=108.271° Z=2	738.07	1.98	mineral biaxial(-) α = 1.499, β = 1.541 γ = 1.542; 2V = 16	
Thebaite-(NH_{4})	(NH_{4},K)_{3}Al(C_{2}O_{4})(PO_{3}OH)_{2}(H_{2}O)		monoclinic	P2_{1}/c	a = 11.156, b = 6.234, c = 18.65, β = 102.93°, Z=4	1264	2.093	biaxial (–) α = 1.490, β = 1.534, γ = 1.570; 2V = 82.7°	
bis(N-methylpiperazinedi-ium) bis(bis(μ-dihydrogen phosphato)-(oxalato)-scandium) oxalate trihydrate	H_{2}mpip⋅Sc(H_{2}PO_{4})_{2}(C_{2}O_{4})·0.5C_{2}O_{4}·1.5H_{2}O			C2	a=17.1307 b=6.6277 c=16.3543 β=103.336°				
Davidbrownite-(NH4)	(NH_{4}), (NH_{4},K)5(V^{4+}O)_{2}(C_{2}O_{4})[PO_{4}H]_{3}·[PO_{4}H_{2}]·3H_{2}O		monoclinic	P2_{1}/c	a = 10.356, b = 8.923, c = 13.486, β = 92.618°, Z = 2	1244.9	2.12	green–blue mineral biaxial (+) α = 1.540, β = 1.550 γ = 1.582; 2V = 58.5	
	(NH_{4})_{2}[(VO)_{2}(HPO_{4})_{2}C_{2}O_{4}]·5H_{2}O								
	Li_{2}(VO)_{2}(HPO_{4})_{2}(C_{2}O_{4})								
	Li_{2}(VO)_{2}(HPO_{4})_{2}(C_{2}O_{4})·6H_{2}O	535.84	triclinic		a = 6.4133 b = 9.2173, c = 14.6206 α = 95.016°, β = 91.797°, γ = 107.7622°, and Z = 2	818.38	2.1743		
	Na_{2}[(VO)_{2}(HPO_{4})_{2}C_{2}O_{4}].2H_{2}O		monoclinic	P2_{1}	a = 6.3534, b = 17.1614, c = 6.5632, β = 106.59			sheet morphology	
	K_{2}[(VO)_{2}(HPO_{4})_{2}(C_{2}O_{4})]	492.05	triclinic		a=6.316 b=7.489 c=10.861 α=56.8° β=57.99° γ=54.20°				
	K_{2}[(VO)_{2}(HPO_{4})_{2}(C_{2}O_{4})]·4.5H_{2}O		triclinic	P1̅	a = 6.3953, b = 9.1451, c = 14.6208, α = 97.269°, β = 91.351° γ = 106.500° Z=2				
	K_{2.5}[(VO)_{2}(HPO_{4})_{1.5}(PO_{4})_{0.5}(C_{2}O_{4})]							MOF	
	LiK[(VO)_{2}(HPO_{4})_{2}(C_{2}O_{4})]·4.5H_{2}O								
	(C_{2}H_{10}N_{2})[VO(HPO_{4})]_{2}(C_{2}O_{4})	473.96	triclinic	P1̅	a = 6.3595, b = 6.6236, c = 9.224, α = 98.216^{o}, β = 108.128^{o}, γ = 100.672^{o}, Z = 1	354.42	2.225		
guanidine vanadyl hydrogenphosphate oxalate	(CH_{6}N_{3})_{2}[VO(HPO_{4})]_{2}(C_{2}O_{4})	532.02	triclinic	P1̅	a = 6.3825, b = 7.8877, c = 9.202, α = 66.602^{o}, β = 71.757^{o}, γ = 79.821^{o}, Z = 1	403.07	2.192		
catena-(4,4'-Bipyridinium bis(μ_{3}-hydrogen phosphato)-(μ_{2}-oxalato)-dioxo-di-vanadium)	(C_{10}H_{10}N_{2})[(VO)(HPO_{4})]_{2}(C_{2}O_{4})		monoclinic	P2_{1}/c	a=9.250 b=6.338 c=16.111, β=98.08°				
	K_{2}Mn^{II}_{2}(H_{2}O)_{2}C_{2}O_{4}(HPO_{3})_{2}							oxalophosphite	
TREN = tris(2-aminoethyl)amine)	(H_{3}TREN)[Mn_{2}(HPO_{4})(C_{2}O_{4})_{2.5}]·3H_{2}O		triclinic	P1̅	a = 8.8385, b = 9.0586, c = 16.020, α = 77.616°, β = 83.359°, γ = 68.251°, and Z = 2.				
mpip1-methylpiperazine	(H_{2}mpip)_{1.5}•Mn_{3}(HPO_{4})(H_{2}PO_{4})(C_{2}O_{4})2								
dap=1,2-diaminopropane	(H_{2}dap)•Mn_{3}(HPO_{4})(H_{2}PO_{4})(C_{2}O_{4})_{2}								
pa=propylamine	(Hpa)•Mn_{3}(HPO_{4})(H_{2}PO_{4})(C_{2}O_{4})_{2}								
dmp = 1,4-dimethylpiperazine	(H_{2}dmp)_{0.5}·Mn(H_{2}PO_{4})(C_{2}O_{4})		triclinic	P1̅	a =5.8528 b =8.1833 c =11.1334, α =103.958° β =93.550° γ =90.572°				
TREN = tris(2-aminoethyl)amine)	(H_{3}TREN)[Fe_{2}(HPO_{4})(C_{2}O_{4})_{2.5}]·3H_{2}O		triclinic	P1̅	a = 8.7776, b = 8.9257, c = 15.884, α = 78.630°, β = 84.018°, and γ = 67.372° Z=2				
1,3-diaminopropane	[C_{3}H_{12}N_{2}]_{2}[Fe_{5}(C_{2}O_{4})_{2}(H_{x}PO_{4})_{8}]	1367.31	triclinic	P1̅	a=9.7851 b=9.8986 c=10.7420 α =73.790 β = 71.684 γ = 79.300 Z=1	942.99	2.408		
	Na_{2}Fe(C_{2}O_{4})(HPO_{4})		monoclinic	P2_{1}/c	a=6.4728, b=20.210, c=10.4712 β=90.745	1369.7		orange	
	K_{2}Fe(C_{2}O_{4})(HPO_{4})(OH_{2}) · H_{2}O	354.08	orthorhombic	Pbca	a=11.880 b=10.384 c=15.337 Z=8	1891.9	2.486	yellow	
	[NH_{3}(CH_{2})_{3}NH_{3}][Zn_{6}(PO_{4})_{4}(C_{2}O_{4})]	456.12	triclinic	P1̅	a =5.0030 b=8.5434 c=12.4336 α=92.99 β=97.138 γ = 91.465 Z=2	526.33	2.878		
MIL-90 pentagallium sesquitrimethylenediamine difluoride dihydroxy oxalate tetraphosphate	Ga_{5}(PO_{4})_{4}(C_{2}O_{4})F_{2}(OH)_{2}·1.5N_{2}C_{3}H_{12}		triclinic	P1̅	a = 8.1217, b = 8.9601, c = 10.4611, α = 111.930°, β = 103.655°, γ = 101.903°	648.59			
NTHU-6	2(C_{13}H_{16}N_{2}) Ga_{10} 8(PO_{4})(HPO_{4})_{4}(OH)_{2}(C_{2}O_{4}).3(H_{2}O)	2251.61	monoclinic	C2/m	a=23.048 b=24.649 c=17.081 β = 132.192 Z=4	7189.8	2.080	yellow	
1,3-diaminopropane	[Ga_{2}(PO_{4})_{2}(H_{2}O)(C_{2}O_{4})_{0.5}](C_{3}N_{2}H_{12})_{0.5}(H_{2}O)								
ethylene diamine	[Ga_{2}(PO_{4})_{2}(C_{2}O_{4})_{0.5}](C_{2}N_{2}H_{10})_{0.5}(H_{2}O)								
1,3-diaminopropane	[Ga_{2}(PO_{4})_{2}(C_{2}O_{4})_{0.5}](C_{3}N_{2}H_{12})_{0.5}								
diethylene triamine	[Ga_{2}(PO_{4})_{2}(H_{2}PO_{4})_{0.5}(C_{2}O_{4})_{0.5}](C_{4}N_{3}H_{16})_{0.5} (H_{2}O)_{1.5}								
diethylene triamine	[Ga_{2.5}(PO_{4})_{2.5}(H_{2}O)_{1.5}(C_{2}O_{4})_{0.5}](C_{4}N_{3}H_{15})_{0.5}								
dmpip = 2,6-dimethyl-piperazine catena-(bis(2,6-dimethylpiperazine-1,4-di-ium) bis(μ-hydrogen phosphato)-bis(μ-phosphato)-(μ-oxalato)-bis(hydrogen phosphato)-tetra-gallium dihydrate	[H_{2}dmpip][Ga_{2}(HPO_{4})_{2}(PO_{4})(C_{2}O_{4})_{0.5}]·H_{2}O		monoclinic	P2_{1}/c	a 8.904 b 28.036 c 8.173, β =100.74°				
catena-(2-(3-ammoniopropyl)propane-1,3-diammonium bis(μ_{4}-phosphato)-bis(μ_{3}-phosphato)-(μ_{2}-oxalato)-(μ_{2}-monohydrogen phosphato)-tetra-gallium dihydrate)	[C_{6}N_{3}H_{19}][Ga_{4}(C_{2}O_{4})(PO_{4})_{4}(H_{2}PO_{4})]·2H_{2}O		monoclinic	C2/c	a =20.355 b =15.649 c =9.0517 β =105.781°				
TMPD = N,N,N′,N′-tetramethyl-1,3-propanediamine	(H_{2}TMPD)_{0.5}[Ga_{3}(C_{2}O_{4})_{0.5}(PO_{4})_{3}]		triclinic		a=8.9999 b=9.1123 c =9.4932 α= 90.837 β=94.231 γ=94.178 Z=2	774.2	2.592	colourless	
	Sr_{2}(H_{2}PO_{4})_{2}(C_{2}O_{4})		monoclinic	P2_{1}/c	a=6.8921 b=8.8733 c=8.6231 β=99.354° Z=2	520.34	2.918	birefringence 0.107@550 nm; band gap 4.84 eV	
Piperazinediium bis(μ_{2}-oxalato-O,O',O'',O''')-bis(μ_{2}-hydrogen phosphato-O,O')-diaqua-di-indium dihydrate	[C_{4}N_{2}H_{12}]0.5In(HPO_{4})(C_{2}O_{4}).H_{2}O		monoclinic	P2_{1}/c	a =6.4726 b =11.080 c =14.311, β =100.316°				
Piperazinium bis(μ_{3}-monhydrogenphosphato)-(μ_{2}-monohydrogenphosphato)-(μ_{2}-oxalato)-di-indium monohydrate	[C_{4}H_{12}N_{2}][In_{2}(C_{2}O_{4})(HPO_{4})_{3}]·H_{2}O		monoclinic	P2_{1}	a =6.5052 b =17.5005 c =8.1811 β =107.656				
dmp = 1,4-dimethylpiperazine bis(1,4-dimethylpiperazine-1,4-diium) bis(μ-oxalato)-tetrakis(μ-dihydrogen phosphato)-tetrakis(μ-hydrogen phosphato)-tetra-indium(iii) dihydrate	H_{2}dmp·In_{2}(HPO_{4})_{2}(H_{2}PO_{4})_{2}(C_{2}O_{4})·H_{2}O				a 7.9684 b 11.9582 c 12.5204, α 89.946° β 84.035° γ 87.287°				
dmapa = 3-(dimethylamino)-1-propylamine	H_{2}dmapa·In_{2}(HPO_{4})_{2}(H_{2}PO_{4})_{2}(C_{2}O_{4})·H_{2}O				a 7.8398 b 12.0428 c 12.4877, α 90.013° β 96.335° γ 92.640°				
	Cs_{2}Fe(C_{2}O_{4})_{0.5}(HPO_{4})_{2}								
	CsFe(C_{2}O_{4})_{0.5}(H_{2}PO_{4})(HPO_{4})								
APPIP = 1,4-bis(3-aminopropyl)piperazine	(H_{4}APPIP)[Er_{3}(C_{2}O_{4})_{5.5}(H_{2}PO_{4})_{2}]·5H_{2}O								
APPIP = 1,4-bis(3-aminopropyl)piperazine	(H_{4}APPIP)[Tm_{3}(C_{2}O_{4})_{5.5}(H_{2}PO_{4})_{2}]·5H_{2}O								
APPIP = 1,4-bis(3-aminopropyl)piperazine	(H_{4}APPIP)[Yb_{3}(C_{2}O_{4})_{5.5}(H_{2}PO_{4})_{2}]·5H_{2}O								
APPIP = 1,4-bis(3-aminopropyl)piperazine	(H_{4}APPIP)[Lu_{3}(C_{2}O_{4})_{5.5}(H_{2}PO_{4})_{2}]·5H_{2}O								
	K_{4}[Th(HPO_{4})_{2}(C_{2}O_{4})2(H_{2}O)_{2}]•4Н_{2}O								
	Pb_{2}(H_{2}PO_{4})_{2}(C_{2}O_{4})				a=7.0302 b=9.0497 c=8.5316 β=100.618° Z=2	533.50	4.335	birefringence 0.129@550 nm; band gap 4.04 eV	
Plutonium(IV) oxalatophosphate	?								
