= Antimonide bromide =

Chemical compounds

Antimonide bromides or bromide antimonides are compounds containing anions composed of bromide (Br^{−}) and antimonide (Sb^{3−}). They can be considered as mixed anion compounds. They are in the category of pnictidehalides. Related compounds include the antimonide chlorides, antimonide iodides, arsenide chlorides, arsenide bromides, arsenide iodides, phosphide chlorides, phosphide bromides, and phosphide iodides. The bromoantimonates have antimony in positive oxidation states.

The antimony can be linked into chains, in which case it has a formal oxidation state of −1. Alternately it can be in pairs as Sb_{2}, with an oxidation state of −2 for each atom.

Many of these compounds are clathrates, whereby there are two interpenetrating structures that are only weakly bound to each other by van der Waals force.

== List ==
formula	system	space group	unit cell Å	volume	density	comment	ref
Ge_{38}Sb_{8}Br_{8}	cubic	P4̅3n	a=10.7893	756.5		clathrate	
Cd_{2}SbBr_{2}	monoclinic	P2_{1}	a=8.244 b=9.920 c=8.492 β=116.80			Contains Sb-Sb^{4−}	
La_{9}Sb_{16}Br_{3}		P6_{3}/m	a = 21.232 c = 4.323			La_{3}Sb trigonal prism columns, Sb_{5} wide strip, La_{6}Br_{6} star	
Hg_{6}Sb_{5}Br_{7}	cubic	Pa3̅	a=13.003 Z=4	2198.6	7.165	black	
Hg_{7}Sb_{4}Br_{6}	cubic	Pa3	a = 12.9940 Z = 4			black	
Hg_{19}Sb_{10}Br_{18}							
(Hg_{13}Sb_{8})(ZnBr_{4})_{4}	orthorhombic	Pnma	a=27.120 b=12.965 c=14.579 Z=4	4126	6.637		
Sb_{2}Hg_{3}GaBr_{4}	orthorhombic	Pnma	a = 13.7549, b = 12.690, c = 14.7819, Z = 8			red	
[Hg_{6}Sb_{4}](InBr_{6})Br	cubic	Pa3̅	a = 12.8542 Z=4	2123.91	7.395	dark red	
Hg_{12}Sb_{6}(Br_{5.186}I_{6.814})	triclinic	P1̅	a = 7.791 b = 11.680 c = 12.404 α = 112.76° β = 99.99° γ = 102.04° Z=1	976,7	7.477	orange; band gap 2.1 eV	
Hg_{3}Sb_{2}TlBr_{3}	orthorhombic	Pbcm	a = 6.610, b = 13.112 c = 13.071			black	
Hg_{6}Sb_{4}BiBr_{7}	cubic	Pa3̅	a=12.998 Z=4	2196.0	7.437	black	
