= AUP =

AUP may refer to:

== Educational institutions ==
- Adventist University of the Philippines
- American University of Paris
- American University Preparatory School

== University presses ==
- Amsterdam University Press
- Associated University Presses, US
- Air University Press

== Other uses ==
- Acceptable use policy, in business
- Agile Unified Process, in programming
- Airspace Use Plan, an airspace management message
- Average Unit Price, a business concept given discounts and revenue share
- Australian pound, a defunct currency
- AuP, the chemical formula of the hypothetical gold phosphide
