= UUP =

UUP may refer to:

- Moscovium, an element formerly known as Ununpentium (Uup)
- Ukrainian Underground Post, an internationally unrecognized postal agency
- Ulster Unionist Party, a political party in Northern Ireland
- United Utah Party, a political party in the United States
- Updated Airspace Use Plan (UUP), an air traffic control status message
- Invesco PowerShares (NYSE stock ticker symbol UUP)
- Royal Malaysian Police Air Wing Unit (Malay: Unit Udara PDRM (UUP))
- uup RNA motif
- Unified Update Platform, a Microsoft's Windows Update delivery service
