= Phosphide bromide =

Class of chemical compounds

Phosphide bromides or bromide phosphides are compounds containing anions composed of bromide (Br^{−}) and phosphide (P^{3−}) anions. Usually phosphorus is covalently connected into more complex structures. They can be considered as mixed anion compounds. They are in the category of pnictidehalides. Related compounds include the phosphide chlorides, phosphide iodides, nitride bromides, arsenide bromides, and antimonide bromides.

== List ==
| formula | system | space group | unit cell Å | volume | density | comment | ref |
|---|---|---|---|---|---|---|---|
| Ca_{2}PBr | cubic | I4̅3d | a=5.96 Z=2 | | | red brown | |
| Ca_{2}PBr | hexagonal | R3̅m | a=4.23 c=20.9 Z=3 | | | | |
| Cu_{12}P_{20}Br_{10} | triclinic | P | a = 9.886, b = 13.190, c = 14.763, α = 70.83°, β = 82.68°, γ = 80.13°, Z = 2 | 1786.1 | | | |
| Cu_{13}P_{15}Br_{12} | | | | | | | |
| Cu_{6}PS_{5}Br | cubic | P4̅3m | a=9.732 Z=4 | 921.8 | 4.701 | red | |
| (CuBr)_{2}P_{8}Se_{3} | orthorhombic | Pbcm | a=8.761 b=11.957 c=13.858 Z=4 | 1451.8 | | | |
| Sr_{2}PBr | cubic | I4̅3d | a=9.31 Z=2 | | | brown violet | |
| Sr_{2}PBr | hexagonal | R3̅m | a=4.44 c=22.0 Z=3 | | | dark reddish brown | |
| Sr_{2}P_{7}Br | cubic | P2_{1}3 | a=9.789 Z=4 | 938.0 | 3.342 | red band gap 2.1 eV | |
| Y_{2}PBr_{2} | rhombohedral | | a=3.9807 c=29.250 | | | | |
| Ag_{6}PS_{5}Br | cubic | P4̅3m | a=10.3765 Z=4 | 1117.26 | 5.460 | red | |
| Cd_{5}P_{2}Br_{4} | orthorhombic | Pna2_{1} | a=12.189, b=7.7080, c=13.664 | | | | |
| Sn_{24}P_{19.3}Br_{8} | | | | | | | |
| Sn_{17}Zn_{7}P_{22}Br_{8} | cubic | Pm3̅n | a=10.7449 | | | | |
| Sn_{24−x}In_{x}P_{19.2+0.2x} x<16 | cubic | Pm3̅n | | | | | |
| Si_{30+x}P_{16–x}Te_{8–x}Br_{x} x = 1–6.4 | cubic | Pm3̅n | a=9.9720 - 10.0405 | | | | |
| Ba_{2}PBr | hexagonal | R3̅m | a=4.67 c=23.3 Z=3 | | | | |
| Ba_{2}P_{7}Br | monoclinic | P2_{1}/m | a=6.294 b=6.835 c=11.850 β=95.819 Z=2 | 507.2 | 3.742 | orange | |
| La_{2}PBr_{2} | trigonal | P3̅m1 | a=4.311 c=11.000 Z=1 | 177.04 | 5.28 | | |
| La_{3}Zn_{4}P_{6.6}Br_{0.8} | orthorhombic | Cmcm | a=4.099 b=14.229 c=20.388 Z=4 | 1189.0 | 5.290 | black | |
| Eu_{2}PBr | | R3m | a = 4.385, c = 21.90, Z = 3 | | | | |
| W_{4}(PBr)Br_{10} | monoclinic | C12/m1 | a=14.0933 b=10.3228 c=11.8169 β=93.906 Z=4 | 1715.16 | | dark green | |
| Hg_{2}P_{3}Br | orthorhombic | Pbcn | a = 8.014, b = 8.902, c = 7.823, Z = 4 | | | | |
| Hg_{7}P_{4}Br_{6} | monoclinic | P2_{1}/c | a = 6.0452, b = 19.848, c = 7.5596 β = 104.214° Z=2 | 879.3 | 7.582 | brown | |
| (Hg_{2}P)_{2}HgBr_{4} | monoclinic | P2_{1} | a=7.776 b=12.226 c=7.930 β=121.34 Z=2 | 643.9 | 7.141 | discovered in 1907; bright yellow; air with light sensitive | |
| [Hg_{7}P_{4}Br_{3}](SnBr_{3}) | cubic | P2_{1}3 | a=12.490 Z=4 | | | | |
