= Arsenide bromide =

Class of chemical compounds

Arsenide bromides or bromide arsenides are compounds containing anions composed of bromide (Br^{−}) and arsenide (As^{3−}). They can be considered as mixed anion compounds. They are in the category of pnictidehalides. Related compounds include the arsenide chlorides, arsenide iodides, phosphide bromides, and antimonide bromides.

== List ==
formula	system	space group	unit cell Å	volume	density	comment	ref
(Ca_{2−x}□_{x})(As_{1−x}Br_{1+x}) Ca_{2}AsBr	cubic		a=6.05		3.47	yellow, or dark brown	
Ca_{3}AsBr_{3}	cubic	Pm3	a=5.91		3.48	colourless or yellow	
Cu_{6}AsS_{5}Br	cubic	F43̅m	a=9.8763		4.80		
(Ge_{38}As_{8})^{+8}⋅8 I^{−}	cubic	Pm3n	a=10.625		5.71	semiconductor resistivity 1 Ω cm; band gap 0.9 eV; silvery grey	
I_{8}As_{21}Ge_{25}	cubic	Pm3̅n	a=10.5963 Z=1	1189.77	6.143	colourless	
Cd_{2}As_{3}Br	monoclinic	C2/c	a = 8.281, b = 9.411, c = 7.993, β = 101.49°, z = 4		5.76	black	
Cd_{4}As_{2}Br_{3}	cubic	Pa3̅	a=12.61		5.51	semiconductor band gap 1.8 eV	
Cd_{4}PAsBr_{3}	cubic	Pa3̅	a=12.521		5.38		
Cd_{4}As_{2}I_{1.5}Br_{1.5}	cubic	Pa3̅	a=12.83				
La_{3}AsBr_{3}	cubic	I4_{1}32	a=12.09		5.50		
Pr_{3}AsBr_{3}	cubic	I4_{1}32	a=12.02		5.64		
Hg_{2}As_{3}Br	monoclinic	C2/c	a = 8.0914, b = 9.300, c = 8.1084, β = 99.323°, z = 4		7.79	black	
Hg_{4}As_{2}Br_{3}	cubic	Pa3	a=12.610 Z=8	2012.4	5.54 7.90	red; dark grey	
Hg_{19}As_{10}Br_{18}	triclinic	P1̅	a = 11.262, b = 11.352, c = 12.309, α = 105.724, β = 105.788, γ = 109.078°	1314.3		dark brown	
(HgBr_{2})_{3}(As_{4}S_{4})_{2}	monoclinic	P2_{1}/c	a = 9.593, b = 11.395, c = 13.402, β = 107.27, Z = 2	1399			
Hg_{3}AsS_{4}Br	hexagonal	P6_{3}mc	a = 7.430, c = 9.364 Z=2				
(Hg_{6}As_{4})[TiBr_{6}]Br	cubic	Pa3	a= 1230.9				
[Hg_{6}As_{4}](CrBr_{6})Br	cubic	Pa	a=12.275			[Hg_{6}As_{4}]^{4+} framework with 2 kinds of cavity; band gap 1.5 eV	
[Hg_{6}As_{4}](FeBr_{6})Hg_{0.6}	cubic	Pa	a=12.332			[Hg_{6}As_{4}]^{4+} framework with 2 kinds of cavity; band gap 1.5 eV	
[Hg_{6}As_{4}](CuBr_{3})_{2}	monoclinic	I2/a	a = 14.884, b = 9.358, c = 20.413, β=92.88°, Z = 6			dark red	
[Hg_{11}As_{4}](GaBr_{4})_{4}	monoclinic	C2/m					
Hg_{3}AsSe_{4}Br	hexagonal	P6_{3}mc	a = 7.707, c = 9.47 Z=2				
(Hg_{2}Cd_{2}As_{2}Br)Br	orthorhombic	Pmma	a = 8.791, b = 4.701, c = 9.779, Z=2	404.2	7.688	dark red	
(Hg_{6}As_{4})(CdBr_{6})	cubic	Pa3̅	a=12.3738 Z=4	1894.6	7.345	red; air stable; band gap 1.94	
[Hg_{6}As_{4}][InBr_{6}]Br	cubic	Pa3̅	a=12.3511 Z=4	1884.2		dark red	
[Hg_{4}As_{2}](InBr_{3.5}As_{0.5})	Hexagonal	P6_{3}/mmc	a = 7.7408, c = 12.535, Z=2	650.47			
[Hg_{6}As_{4}Br_{3}](SnBr_{3})	cubic	P2_{1}3	a=12.383 Z=4				
[Hg_{6}As_{4}][YbBr_{6}]Br	cubic	Pa3̅	a=12.362 Z=4	1889.1	7.860	dark red	
Hg_{9}As_{4}Bi_{2}Br_{12}	tetragonal	P4_{3}	a=10.865 b=10.865 c=28.357 Z=4	3347.5	6.91	orange	
