= Arsenide chloride =

Chemical compound

Arsenide chlorides or chloride arsenides are compounds containing anions composed of chloride (Cl^{−}) and arsenide (As^{3−}). They can be considered as mixed anion compounds. They are in the category of pnictidehalides. Related compounds include the arsenide bromides, arsenide iodides, phosphide chlorides, and antimonide chlorides.

== List ==
formula	system	space group	unit cell Å	volume	density	comment	ref
Ca_{3}AsCl_{3}		Pm3m	a= 5.760				
Sr_{2}AsCl						dark violet	
Cd_{8}As_{7}Cl	cubic	P23	a=7.266, Z=1				
Hg_{7.4}As_{4}Cl_{6}	cubic	Pa3	a= 12.178, Z= 4				
(Hg_{6}As_{4})(HgCl_{6})Hg_{0.5}	cubic	Pa3̅	a=12.189 Z=4	1810.7	7.398	yellow; air stable; band gap 2.01	
(Hg_{6}As_{4})[TiCl_{6}]Cl	cubic	Pa3	a = 1209.4				
[Hg_{4}As_{2}][ZrCl_{6}]	orthorhombic	Pbca	a=13.277 b=13.420 c=16.814 Z=8	2769.1	5.570	dark yellow	
[Hg_{4}As_{2}][HfCl_{6}]	orthorhombic	Pbca	a=13.273 b=13.413 c=16.809 Z=8	2992	5.964	orange	
(Hg_{3}AsS)(GaCl_{4})	hexagonal	P6_{3}/mc	a =7.245, c =11.960, Z = 2	543.6	5.622	light yellow	
Hg_{3}AsS_{4}Cl	hexagonal	P6_{3}mc	a = 7.431, c = 9.003 Z=2			yellow; air stable	
[Hg_{6}As_{4}](CuCl_{3})_{2}	monoclinic	I2/a	a = 14.690, b = 9.1851, c = 20.285, β=92.170, Z=6				
(Hg_{9.75}As_{5.5})(GaCl_{4})_{3}	orthorhombic	Pmn2_{1}	a=22.567 b=12.146 c=12.983 Z=4	3559	5.604		
(Hg_{6}As_{4})[MoCl_{6}]Cl	cubic	Pa3	a = 12.078				
[Hg_{6}As_{4}](AgCl_{3})_{2}	monoclinic	I2/a	a = 14.690, b = 9.1851, c = 20.285, β = 93.17°, Z = 4				
(Hg_{6}As_{4})(CdCl_{6})Hg_{0.5}	cubic	Pa3̅	a=12.172 Z=4	1803.2	7.104	yellow; air stable; band gap 2.05	
[Hg_{6}As_{4}](InCl_{6})Cl	cubic	Pa3	a = 12.109, Z = 4			dark red	
[Hg_{6}As_{4}Cl_{3}](SnCl_{3})Hg_{0.13}	cubic	P2_{1}3	a=12.233 Z=4				
Hg_{3}As_{2}TlCl_{3}	orthorhombic	Pbcm	a = 6.292, b = 12.341 c = 12.248 Z=4			red	
Hg_{6}As_{4}BiCl_{7}	cubic	Pa3	a=12.178 Z=4				
[Hg_{4}As_{2}][UCl_{6}]	orthorhombic	Pbca	a=13.316 b=13.636 c=16.853 Z=8	3060.0	6.090	red	
