= Gold phosphide =

Gold phosphides are inorganic compounds of gold and phosphorus. The only known gold phosphide is a metastable gold(I) polyphosphide with the formula Au_{2}P_{3}.

Older texts sometimes refer to a binary auric phosphide AuP; this hypothetical compound has not been verified by modern methods such as X-ray crystallography.

== Preparation ==
Monoclinic Au_{2}P_{3} is produced by direct reaction between metallic gold and red phosphorus at high temperatures over multiple days. The reaction produced only Au_{2}P_{3}, with no other compounds observed across a wide variety of Au:P atom ratios.

Gold(III) phosphide was purportedly prepared by the direct reaction of spongy gold and phosphorus or by passing phosphine into a solution of auric chloride in ether or alcohol:

AuCl_{3} + PH_{3} → AuP + 3HCl

== Properties ==
Au_{2}P_{3} is claimed to decompose in air or with H_{2}O. It has a monoclinic crystal structure.

== Related ==
A mixed anion phosphide iodide, Au_{7}P_{10}I, is known to possess a trigonal structure.
