= Antimonide iodide =

Class of chemical compounds

Antimonide iodides or iodide antimonides are compounds containing anions composed of iodide (I^{−}) and antimonide (Sb^{3−}). They can be considered as mixed anion compounds. They are in the category of pnictide halides. Related compounds include the antimonide chlorides, antimonide bromides, phosphide iodides, and arsenide iodides.

== List ==
formula	system	space group	unit cell Å	volume	density	comment	ref
Ge_{38}Sb_{8}I_{8}	cubic	Pm3̅n	a=10.8892			clathrate; band gap 1.16 eV; thermal conductivity 7 mWcm^{−1}K^{−1}	
Cd_{4}Sb_{2}I_{3}	cubic	Pa3̅	a=13.48				
Sn_{38}Sb_{8}I_{8}	cubic	Pm3̅n	a=12.0447			clathrate; band gap 0.80 eV; thermal conductivity 12mWcm^{−1}K^{−1}	
La_{2}SbI_{2}	rhombohedral		a=4.530 c=32.80				
Hg_{5}Sb_{2}I_{6}	orthorhombic	Pc2_{1}n	a=8.108, b=10.702, c=21.295	1847.7	7.217	Dark red	
(Hg_{6}Sb_{4})(CdI_{6})	rhombohedral	R3̅c	a = 13.3818, α = 90.93°,	2395.3	7.111	black	
(Hg_{6}Sb_{4})(CdI_{6})Hg_{0.6}	cubic	Pa3̅	a=13.234	2317.7	7.604	black; band gap 1.23; air stable	
[Hg_{6}Sb_{4}I_{3}](SnI_{3})Hg_{0.16}	cubic	P2_{1}3	a=13.285 Z=4				
