= Arsenide iodide =

Class of chemical compounds

Arsenide iodides or iodide arsenides are compounds containing anions composed of iodide (I^{−}) and arsenide (As^{3−}). They can be considered as mixed anion compounds. They are in the category of pnictidehalides. Related compounds include the arsenide chlorides, arsenide bromides, phosphide iodides, and antimonide iodides.

== List ==
formula	system	space group	unit cell Å	volume	density	comment	ref
Ca_{2}AsI	trigonal	R3̅m	a=4.397, c = 22.29, Z = 3		3.76	brown	
Ca_{3}AsI_{3}	cubic	I4_{1}32	a=12.42		3.99	colourless	
Cu_{2}P_{1.8}As_{1.2}I_{2}	monoclinic	P2_{1}/c	a = 15.477, b = 13.200, c = 15.421, β = 115.406°, Z = 16			Cu exchangeable with Ag; band gap 1.2 eV	
Ge_{38}As_{8}I_{8}	cubic	P4̅3m	a=10.611			metallic; water and air stable	
Ag_{2}P_{1.8}As_{1.2}I_{2}	monoclinic	P2_{1}/c	a = 15.84, b = 13.68, c = 15.58 and β = 117.63° Z=16				
Sn_{24}As_{19.3}I_{8}	cubic		a=22.179 Z=8			black	
Sn_{20.5}□_{3.5}As_{22}I_{8}	cubic		a=22.1837			low thermal conductivity	
Sn_{24}As_{x}P_{19.3−x}I_{8 x=0-16}	cubic	Pm3n	a = 10.9358—11.1495				
Sn_{19.3}Cu_{4.7}As_{22}I_{8}	cubic	Pm3̅n	a = 11.1736 Z = 1	1394.4	6.236	clathrate; Zintl; diamagnetic	
Sn_{24–x–δ}In_{x}As_{22–y}I_{8}	cubic	Pm3̅n	a = 11.088 (x = 0) to a = 11.343 (x = 10.7)			clathrate	
La_{2}AsI_{2}	trigonal	P3̅m1	a=4.3795 c=10.910		5.56		
Hg_{4}AsI_{5}	orthorhombic	Cmca	a=11.927 b=12.128 c=19.776 Z=8	2859.0	7.025	red	
Hg_{4}As_{2}I_{3}	cubic	Pa3̅	a=12.999 Z=8	2196	8.06	black	
HgI_{2}⋅As_{4}S_{4}	monoclinic	P2_{1}/c	a=9.433 b=14.986 c=11.624 β=127.72° Z=4	1299	4.509	orange; dec 212 °C	
Hg_{5}AsS_{2}I_{3}	monoclinic	C2/c	a=13.339 b=8.444 c=13.428 β=118.352 Z=4	1331.2	7.599	black; dec 150 °C	
Hg_{3}AsSe_{4}I	hexagonal	P6_{3}mc	a = 7.6902, c = 9.968 Z=2			red; air stable	
[Hg_{7}As_{4}](AgI_{3})_{2}	cubic	Pa	a = 13.138 Z = 4				
(Hg_{2}As)_{2}(CdI_{4})	monoclinic	P2_{1}	a=7.945, b=12.934, c=8.094, β=116.898°	741.7			
[Hg_{7}As_{4}I_{3}](SnI_{3})	cubic	P2_{1}3	a = 13.110, Z = 4	2253.2	7.617	black	
