= Bromoantimonates =

Chemical compounds

Bromoantimonates are compounds containing anions composed of bromide (Br^{−}) and antimony (Sb). They can be considered as double bromides, metallohalides or halometallates. They are in the category of halopnictates. Related compounds include the bromobismuthates, iodoantimonates, bromophosphates, and bromoarsenates. Bromoantimonates can have antimony in one of two oxidation states, +3 or +5, and are being researched for use in photovoltaics, X-ray detectors, and LEDs.

== Some examples of bromoantimonates ==
Bromoantimonates can have antimony in one of two oxidation states, either +3 or +5. These are designated by bromoantimonate(III) or bromoantimonate(V). Although antimony tribromide is known, SbBr_{5} on its own does not exist, despite the existence of SbBr^{−}_{6}. Compounds containing both Sb(III) and Sb(V) are mixed valence compounds. The antimony can be linked into chains, (which are called one-dimensional as it is like a line), or in pairs as Sb_{2} or singly as Sb (which are called zero-dimensional, as the anions are just point-like).

Tetrabromoantimonate(III) (SbBr_{4}^{−}) has single antimony atoms in each anion.

SbBr_{5}^{2−} contains infinite chains of SbBr_{6} octahedra linked by corners.

Hexabromoantimonate(III) SbBr_{6}^{3−} also exists, forming zero-dimensional compounds.

Nonabromodiantimonate(III) Sb_{2}Br_{9}^{3−} has a pair of octahedra of SbBr_{6} sharing a face. The angles formed by shared bromine at the antimony are reduced from the theoretical 90° to about 80°.

Hexabromoantimonate(V) SbBr_{6}^{−} exists in equilibrium with SbBr_{4}^{−} and Br_{2} but real +5 oxidation state bromoantimonates exist even if SbBr_{5} is unstable and does not exist.

Intersecting classes are nonahalogenodiantimon(III)ates. Hexahaloantimonate(III) ions (SbX_{6}^{3−}) can include chlorine or iodine as well as bromine.

Related classes include halogeno-oxydiantimon(III)ates, and pentabromothio-diantimonates. Bromo-phenylantimonates(V) ([C_{6}H_{5}−SbBr_{5}]^{−}) have a phenyl group substituting for one bromine atom. Chlorobromoantimonates(V) have some chlorine instead of bromine.

The antimonide bromides are distinct as they do not have a bond between antimony and bromine. Tetrabromostibonium(V) contains cations (SbBr^{+}_{4}) rather than anions.

== Preparation ==
Bromoantimonates can be made using a water solution of antimony tribromide, hydrobromic acid, and an amine. Alternately antimony trioxide can be used. Variants can be made without using water, and heating the antimony tribromide with an amine hydrobromide.

== Some properties ==
Most of the bromoantimonate salts are yellow or orange.

For SbBr^{−}_{4} there are absorption bands at 224, 300, 245 and 216 nm. SbBr^{3−}_{6} has absorption bands centred on 359, 311, and 266 nm.

Many alkylammonium salts are known. These can have different solid phases at different temperatures, as the alkyl group varies in disorder. Those with longer alkyl chains have a greater number of solid state phases.

Methyl ammonium compounds are ferroelectric.

The infrared spectrum includes wavenumbers (ν/c) of 110 to 130 cm^{−1} for the bridging bromine in Sb_{2}Br_{9} and 135 to 220 cm^{−1} for non-bridging bromine to antimony stretching.

Bond lengths in SbBr_{6}^{−} are 2.65 and 2.56 Å. In SbBr_{6}^{3−} the lengths are greater, from 2.787 to 2.713 Å.

== Use ==
Bromoantimonates are researched for use in photovoltaics, X-ray detectors, and LEDs.

== List ==
Name (full or part)	Formula	System	Space group	Unit cell (Å)	Volume	Density	Notes	Ref
tropylium	(C_{7}H_{7})SbBr_{4}	monoclinic	C2/c	a=13.8187 b=13.8564 c=7.5399 β=120.494°				
ammonium	[H_{4}N]_{2}SbBr_{6}	tetragonal	I4_{1}/amd	a=10.66 c=21.52			black; Sb(III) and Sb(V)	
ammonium	(NH_{4})_{3}Sb_{2}Br_{9}						inefficient photovoltaic; soluble in ethanol	
ammonium	(NH_{4})_{7}Sb_{3}Br_{16}							
guanidinium	[C(NH_{2})_{3}]SbBr_{6}						black; Sb(V)	
guanidinium	[C(NH_{2})_{3}]_{3}Sb_{2}Br_{9}	monoclinic	C2/c	a = 15.695 b = 9.039 c = 18.364 β = 96.94° Z=4			@143K; phase transition 435/450 K	
Tris(N,N,N',N'-tetramethylguanidinium) nonabromodiantimonate(III)	[NH_{2}C(N(CH_{3})_{2})_{2}]_{3}[Sb_{2}Br_{9}]	triclinic	P1̅	a 10.9824 b 12.1782 c 15.0405 α 71.064° β 88.199° γ 85.024°				
methylammonium	(CH_{3}NH_{3})_{3}SbBr_{6}	monoclinic	P2_{1}/c	a=13.577 b=8.254 c=21.665 β=134.05° Z=4				
methylammonium bromoantimonate(III)	(CH_{3}NH_{3})_{3}Sb_{2}Br_{9}		P3̅m1	a=8.188 c=9.927 Z=1		3.049	yellow	
dimethyl ammonium	[(CH_{3})_{2}NH_{2}]_{3}SbBr_{6}							
tris (dimethylammonium) nonabromodiantimonate(III)	[(CH_{3})_{2}NH_{2}]_{3}Sb_{2}Br_{9}	monoclinic	P2_{1}/a	a = 14.612 b = 9.228 c = 10.005 β = 94.91° Z = 2				
	[NH_{2}(CH_{3})_{2}]_{3}Sb_{2}Br_{9}							
tris(Trimethylammonium) nonabromodiantimonate(III)	[(CH_{3})_{3}NH]_{3}Sb_{2}Br_{9}	orthorhomic		a 11.40 b 10.31 c 12.91				
tetramethylammonium	[NMe_{4}]_{3}[Sb_{2}Br_{9}]	hexagonal	P6_{3}/mmc	a=9.499 c=22.225 Z=2			crimson red	
tetramethylammonium	[NMe_{4}]_{3}[Sb_{2}Br_{9}]•Br_{2}	hexagonal	P6_{3}/mmc	a=9.585 c=22.667 Z=2				
tetramethylammonium	[(CH_{3})_{4}N]_{3}Sb_{3}Br_{9}•Br_{2}	hexagonal	P6_{3}/mmc	a=9.5850 c=22.667 Z=2		2.48	red; yellow-orange when cold	
tetramethylammonium	[(CH_{3})_{4}N]_{3}Sb_{2}Br_{9}•I_{2}	triclinic	P1̅	a=9.4869 b=9.5409 c=22.4906 α=92.058° β=90.933° γ=118.386° Z=2	1788.5		dark	
ethylammonium	(C_{2}H_{5}NH_{3})_{2}[SbBr_{5}]	orthorhombic	Cmca	a= 7.815 b=22.301 c=18.100 Z=8	3154.5	2.584	at 298K; yellow; phase transition at 158.5K; decompose >450K	
ethylammonium	(C_{2}H_{5}NH_{3})_{2}[SbBr_{5}]	orthorhombic	Pbca	a=7.684 b=22.413 c=17.780 Z=8	3062.1	2.661	at 90K; yellow	
ethylammonium	(C_{2}H_{5}NH_{3})_{2}[SbBr_{7}]							
diethylammonium	([C_{2}H_{5}]_{2}NH_{2})_{3}SbBr_{6}	hexagonal	R3c	a=15.155 c=20.085 Z=6			dissolves in acetone	
tetraethylammonium	[(C_{2}H_{5})_{4}N]_{2}SbBr_{6}						very dark reddish brown	
tetraethylammonium	[(C_{2}H_{5})_{4}N]_{3}Sb_{2}Br_{9}	hexagonal	P6_{3}22	a=10.3 c=24.4 Z=2	2242	2.02	yellow	
tetraethylammonium hexabromoantimonate(V)	[(C_{2}H_{5})_{4}N]SbBr_{6}	tetragonal	I4_{1}md	a=8.7008 c=24.797 Z=4	1877.3	2.59	dark red-brown	
n-propylammonium	(n-C_{3}H_{7}NH_{3})_{2}SbBr_{5}	orthorhombic	?	a =7.884 b=14.516 c=15.913 Z=4	1821.1	2.33	4 phase transitions: 189K, 165/163, 137/154	
di-n-propylammonium	[(n-C_{3}H_{7})_{2}NH_{2}]_{3}SbBr_{6}	hexagonal	R3̅c	a=13.649 c=31.548 Z=6			dissolves in acetone	
tris(Tri-n-propylammonium) nonabromodiantimonate(III)	[(n-C_{3}H_{7})_{3}NH]_{3}Sb_{2}Br_{9}	orthorhombic	?	a 12.91 b 14.51 c 20.0				
bis(Isopropylammonium) pentabromoantimonate(III)	[(i-C_{3}H_{7})_{2}NH_{2}]_{2}SbBr_{5}	orthorhombic		a 14.99 b 16.687 c 21.72				
tetrapropylammonium	[(C_{3}H_{7})_{4}N][SbBr_{4}]	orthorhombic	Pbca	a=15.566 b=13.822 c=19.574 Z=8	4211.5		yellow	
isopropylammonium	[(CH_{3})_{2}CHNH_{3}]_{2}SbBr_{5}	orthorhombic		a=12.013 b =12.134 c=12.525			phase transition at 171K, 180 K	
isopropylammonium	[(CH_{3})_{2}CHNH_{3}]_{2}SbBr_{5}	monoclinic						
tris(N-ethyl-N,N-dipropylpropan-1-aminium) tetrakis(μ-bromo)-octabromo-tri-antimony	(Et(n-Pr)_{3}N)_{3}[Sb_{3}Br_{12}]	triclinic	P1̅	a 10.6469 b 14.8847 c 18.3714 α 86.082° β 85.502° γ 84.116°				
isobutyl	(i-C_{4}H_{9}NH_{3})_{2}SbBr_{5}							
ethanediammonium	[NH_{3}(CH_{2})_{2}NH_{3}]_{5}(Sb_{2}Br_{11})_{2}·4H_{2}O	monoclinic	P2_{1}/a	a = 14.346 b = 13.206 c = 17.027 β = 113.05° Z = 2		2.941		
N,N,N',N'-tetramethylethylendiammonium [tetrabromidoantimonate(III)-μ-bromido] hemihydrate	(C_{6}H_{18}N_{2})_{2}[Sb_{2}Br_{10}]·H_{2}O	orthorhombic	Pbca	a = 18.0860 b = 19.1755 c = 19.4619 Z=8	6749.5	2.553	yellow	
anilinium	(C_{6}H_{5}NH_{3})_{2}SbBr_{5}	orthorhombic	Pbca	a = 19.704 b = 7.914 c = 25.556, Z = 8	3985	2.365	yellow green; insoluble water	
dihydrazinium pentabromoantimonite	(N_{2}H_{5})_{2}SbBr_{5}						yellow	
Trihydrazinium nonabromodiantimonite	(N_{2}H_{5})_{3}Sb_{2}Br_{9}						yellow	
Undecahydrazinium heptadecabromodiantimonite	(N_{2}H_{5})_{11}Sb_{2}Br_{17}						yellow; melt 165°	
Decahydrazinium nonadecabromotriantimonite	(N_{2}H_{5})_{10}Sb_{3}Br_{19}						yellow	
triazolinium	(C_{2}H_{4}N_{3})_{2}[SbBr_{5}]·(C_{2}H_{4}N_{3})Br	orthorhombic	P2_{1}2_{1}2_{1}	a=8.6087 b=11.7985 c=20.5457				
1,2,4-triazolium	(C_{2}N_{3}H_{4})_{3}[SbBr_{6}]	tetragonal	P4_{2}/m	a=11.149 c=8.318 Z=2	1033.9	2.606	@320K	
1,2,4-triazolium	(C_{2}N_{3}H_{4})_{3}[SbBr_{6}]	monoclinic		a=15.699 b=16.294 c=15.018 β = 90.41 Z=8	4097	2.631	@293K	
allylammonium	(C_{3}H_{5}NH_{3})_{3}SbBr_{6}	monoclinic	C2/m				4 phases	
butylammonium	[n-C_{4}H_{9}NH_{3}]_{2}•[SbBr_{5}]	orthorhombic	Pnma	a=16.845 b=54.899 c=15.697			340K deep yellow; 3 phases	
butylammonium	[n-C_{4}H_{9}NH_{3}]_{2}•[SbBr_{5}]	monoclinic	P2/m	a=15.597, b=62.854, c=16.771 β=92.05°			300K	
tris(n-Butylammonium) hexabromo-antimony(III)	[n-C_{4}H_{9}NH_{3}]_{3}•[SbBr_{6}]			a 11.47 b 15.07 c 18.57				
di-n-butylammonium	[(n-C_{4}H_{9})_{2}NH_{2}]_{3}•[SbBr_{6}]	monoclinic	P2_{1}/c	a 13.03 b 13.51 c 18.94 β 94.0°				
tetra-n-butylammonium hexa-bromoantimonate(V)	[(n-C_{4}H_{9})_{4}N]•[SbBr_{6}]							
pentylammonium	[n-C_{5}H_{11}NH_{3}]_{2}•[SbBr_{5}]	orthorhombic	Pna2_{1}	a=17.0105 b=32.875 c=7.8882			298K; 3 phases transitions at 388K 224K	
pentylammonium	[n-C_{5}H_{11}NH_{3}]_{2}•[SbBr_{5}]	orthorhombic	P2_{1}2_{1}2_{1}	a=16.9234 b=32.3689 c=7.7418			86K	
2,2-difluoroethylammonium	[C_{2}H_{6}F_{2}N]_{3}SbBr_{6}	monoclinic	P_{1}2_{1}/n_{1}	a=8.0145 b=12.1192 c=21.2967 β=91.686 Z=4	2067.6	2.722	yellow	
N-ethyl-1,3-propanediammonium	[C_{5}N_{2}H_{16}]_{2}SbBr_{5}	monoclinic	P2_{1}/c	a=21.426 b=7.889 c=19.96 β=116.79° Z=8	3012			
N-ethyl-1,3-propanediammonium	[C_{5}N_{2}H_{16}]_{2}SbBr_{5}	orthorhombic	Pnma	a=19.23 b=7.894 c=10.118 Z=4	1536		yellow	
bis(N,N-diethylethylendiammonium) decabromodiantimoinate(III)	[C_{6}H_{18}N_{2}]_{2}Sb_{2}Br_{10}	monoclinic	P2_{1}/c	a = 10.7309 b = 10.5842 c = 14.5551 β = 96.962° Z = 4.			yellow	
1,5-pentanediammonium pentabromoantimonate (III)	[NH_{3}(CH_{2})_{5}NH_{3}]SbBr_{5}	orthorhombic	P2_{1}2_{1}2_{1}	a 7.964 b 13.9424 c 14.065			@293K	
1,5-pentanediammonium pentabromoantimonate (III)	[NH_{3}(CH_{2})_{5}NH_{3}]SbBr_{5}	orthorhombic	Pnma	a 14.04 b 8.04 c 13.97			@393K	
Ethyldimethylphenylammonium	[EtMe_{2}PhN]_{3}[Sb_{2}Br_{9}]	orthorhombic	Pnma	a = 35.620 b = 9.954 c = 12.761 Z = 4				
Tris(N,N-dimethylanilinium) tri—bromido-bis[tribromidoantimonate(III)]	(C_{8}H_{12}N)_{3}[Sb_{2}Br_{9}]	triclinic	P1̅	a 9.7857(b 13.7658(c 17.0297(α 66.581( β 78.689( γ 72.601( Z=2				
	[CH_{3}SC(NH_{2})_{2}]_{2}SbBr_{5}			11.4258 b=8.9079 c=17.3627 β=92.225 Z=4	1765.8	2.647		
cyclopropylammonium	[C_{3}H_{8}N]_{2}SbBr_{5}	monoclinic	P2_{1}/c	a=11.8937 b=19.0986 c=7.8047 β = 108.908°	1168.0	2.525	270K	
cyclopropylammonium	[C_{3}H_{8}N]_{2}SbBr_{5}	orthorhombic	Pnca	a=22.5314 b=18.9885 c=7.8845 Z=8	2336.0	2.511	300K	
cyclopropylammonium	[C_{3}H_{8}N]_{2}SbBr_{5}	orthorhombic	Bbcm	a=22.4485 b=18.9653 c=7.9488 Z=8	2256	2.503	325K; band gap 2.41 eV; phase changes at 290 K and = 315 K	
Benzeneethanammonium	(C_{8}NH_{12})_{2}SbBr_{5}						yellow	
phenylmethylammonium	(C_{6}H_{5}CH_{2}NH_{3})_{3}SbBr_{6}	monoclinic	P2_{1}/c	a 15.2246 b 8.0632 c 24.3042 β 100.005° Z=4	2938.2	2.093	yellow	
(R)-(−)-1-cyclohexylethylammonium	(R-CHEAH)Sb_{3}Br_{10}	monoclinic	P2_{1}	a=12.76938 b=30.1777 c=13.2336 β=90.818				
Pyrrolidinium	[C_{4}H_{9}N]_{2}SbBr_{8}	monoclinic		a=31.4 b=9.71 c=15.0 β=99.0° Z=8	4517	2.50	black	
2-Pyrolidonium	[C_{4}H_{6}ONH]_{2}SbBr_{8}						black; orange red when cold	
N-methylpyrrolidinium	[C_{4}H_{9}NCH_{3}]_{3}Sb_{2}Br_{9}	trigonal	R3c	a=15.6943 c=15.6943 Z=6	5018.8	2.424	yellow @293K	
N-methylpyrrolidinium	[C_{4}H_{9}NCH_{3}]_{3}Sb_{2}Br_{9}	trigonal	R3̅c	a=15.9951 c=23.1124 Z=5	5120.9	2.376	@335K	
N-methylpiperidine	(C_{6}H_{14}N)_{3}Sb_{3}Br_{12}	monoclinic	P2_{1}/n	a=10.9372 b=21.928 c=17.598 β=90.796° Z=4	4219.5			
Piperidinium	[C_{5}H_{11}N]_{2}SbBr_{8}	monoclinic		a=28.8 b=19.8 c=18.7 β=116.28 Z=16	9561	2.58	black	
Piperazine-1,4-diium	(C_{4}H_{12}N_{2})[SbBr_{5}]·H_{2}O	monoclinic	P2_{1}/n	a=9.9162 b=14.4090 c=10.3898 β=99.432 Z=4	1464.45	2.846		
Morpholinium	[NH_{2}(C_{2}H_{4})_{2}O]SbBr_{4}	orthorhombic	Pbca	a=12.273 b=8.397 c=23.276 Z=8	2399	2.933	yellow	
Morpholinium	[NH_{2}(C_{2}H_{4})_{2}O]_{2}[SbBr_{5}]	orthorhombic	P2_{1}2_{1}2_{1}	a 9.274 b 10.325 c 18.472 Z=4	1768.8	2.620	yellow; piezoelectric	
Morpholinium	[C_{4}H_{9}ONH]_{2}SbBr_{8}	orthorhombic	Pna2_{1}	a=28.01 b=8.31 c=10.02 Z=4	2332	2.64	black; red when cold	
Pyridinium	(C_{5}H_{5}NH)SbBr_{4}	triclinic	P1̅				@116K	
Pyridinium	(C_{5}H_{5}NH)SbBr_{4}	monoclinic	C2/c	a=11.825 b=13.048 c=7.798 β=93.87° Z=4		2.922	@297K	
Pyridinium	(C_{5}H_{5}NH)_{6}Sb^{III}Sb^{V}_{3}Br_{24}	orthorhombic	CmC21	a=17.51 b=23.77 c=16.46 Z=4	6851	2.80	black	
benzylammonium	(C_{6}H_{5}CH_{2}NH_{3})_{2}SbBr_{5}	monoclinic	P2_{1}/a	a=8.0254 b=19.5087 c=14.5079 β=107.451 Z=4	2166.89	2.261	yellow	
1-methylpyridinium	(1−CH_{3}C_{5}H_{4}NH)SbBr_{4}	monoclinic	P2_{1}/c	a=12.73 b=13.54 c=7.59 β=107.3 Z=4	1250	2.85	pale yellow	
bis(1-methylpyridin-1-ium) hexabromo-antimony tribromide	(1−CH_{3}C_{5}H_{4}NH)_{2}SbBr_{6}•Br_{3}	triclinic	P1̅	a 7.4567 b 9.4488 c 9.6777 α 68.629° β 89.848° γ 73.002°	1029.2			(1)
2-methylpyridinium	(2−CH_{3}C_{5}H_{4}NH)SbBr_{4}	monoclinic	P2_{1}/c	a=12.84 b=13.31 c=7.65 β=106.6 Z=4	1252	2.84	pale yellow	
3-methylpyridinium	(3−CH_{3}C_{5}H_{4}NH)SbBr_{4}	monoclinic	P2_{1}/c	a=12.51 b=13.64 c=7.72 β=106.9 Z=4	1260	2.76	pale yellow	
bis(2-bromo-5-methylpyridinium) hexabromoantimonate tribromide	(2-Br-5-MePy)_{2}[SbBr_{6}](Br_{3})	monoclinic	Im	a 8.4041 b 13.341 c 12.237 β 95.731°				
3-carboxylpyridinium	(3−COOHC_{5}H_{4}NH)_{2}SbBr_{5}	monoclinic	C2/c	a=14.10 b=19.43 c=8.01 β=98.6° Z=4	2169	2.36	lemon yellow	
4-methylpyridinium	(4−CH_{3}C_{5}H_{4}NH)SbBr_{4}	monoclinic	P2_{1}/c	a 12.011 b 13.581 c 7.7637 β 90.341°				
4-methylpyridinium	(4−CH_{3}C_{5}H_{4}NH)_{2}SbBr_{5}	triclinic	P1̅	a=10.66 b=10.86 c=9.30 α=108.8° β=97.7° γ=99.2° Z=2	985	2.39	yellow needles	
4-methylpyridinium	(4−CH_{3}C_{5}H_{4}NH)_{3}Sb_{2}Br_{9}•I_{2}	monoclinic	P2_{1}	a=8.3290 b=23.5510 c=9.4722 β=104.388 Z=2	1799.7			
4-methylpyridinium	(4−CH_{3}C_{5}H_{4}NH)_{2}SbBr_{5}•I_{2}	monoclinic	P2_{1}/n	a=7.5955 b=14.6757 c=9.5902 β=91.607 Z=2	2182.85			
4-methylpyridinium	(4-C_{6}H_{7}NH)_{2}Sb^{V}Br_{9}	monoclinic	C2/m	a=18.39 b=7.440 c=9.84 β=113.14°		2.760	red	
α-picolinium	(2−CH_{3}C_{5}H_{4}NH)_{2}SbBr_{9}	triclinic	P1̅	a 9.249 b 9.750 c 7.645 α 90.07° β 107.46° γ 70.52° Z=2		2.77	black; orange at −174°	
β-picolinium	(3−CH_{3}C_{5}H_{4}NH)_{2}SbBr_{9}	monoclinic		Z=2		2.74	black; orange at −174°	
γ-picolinium	(4−CH_{3}C_{5}H_{4}NH)_{2}SbBr_{9}	monoclinic		Z=2		2.77	black; red at −174°	
1-fluoropyridinium	(1-FPy)_{3}[Sb_{2}Br_{9}]	monoclinic	C2/c	a=21.85 b=21.15 c=13.85 β=104.6° Z=8	6179	2.70	deep yellow	
1-bromopyridinium	?	monoclinic	C2/c	a=11.83 b=13.03 c=7.70 β=93.9°	1183	2.4	light orange	
2-chloropyridinium	(2-ClPyH)_{2}SbBr_{5}	monoclinic	P2_{1}/a	a=10.64 b=15.87 c=5.88 β=105.3° Z=2	957	2.60	orange	
2-chloropyridinium	(2-ClPyH)SbBr_{6}	monoclinic	P2_{1}/c	a=13.0770 b=7.3498 c=16.5301 β=112.117°			Sb(V)	
2-bromopyridinium	(2-BrPyH)_{2}SbBr_{5}	monoclinic	P2_{1}/a	a=10.53 b=16.17 c=5.89 β=104.8° Z=2	989	2.82	red	
2-bromopyridinium	(2-BrPyH)SbBr_{6}	monoclinic	P2_{1}/c	a=13.111 b=7.3787 c=16.555 β=111.179°			Sb(V)	
bis(2-iodopyridinium) hexabromoantimonate tribromide	(2-IPyH)_{2}[SbBr_{6}](Br_{3})	monoclinic	P2_{1}/n	a 8.1800 b 12.9394 c 12.5865 β 105.412°				
3-chloropyridinium	(3-ClPyH)SbBr_{6}	orthorhombic	Pca2_{1}	a=16.6414 b=7.3471 c=24.2543 Z=8	2965.5		cherry-red	
3-bromopyridinium	(3-BrPyH)_{2}SbBr_{5}	monoclinic	P2_{1}/c	a=18.37 b=11.98 c=9.35 β=102.5° Z=4	2009	2.77	pale yellow	
3-bromopyridinium	(3-BrPyH)SbBr_{6}	orthorhombic	Pca2_{1}				cherry-red	
3-iodopyridinium	(3-IPyH)_{2}SbBr_{5}	monoclinic	P2_{1}/c	a=17.99 b=12.31 c=9.35 β=91.5° Z=4	2070	2.99	pale yellow	
4-bromopyridinium pentabromoantimonate(III)	(4-BrC_{5}H_{4}NH)_{2}SbBr_{5}	triclinic	P1̅	a = 9.186 b = 10.622 c = 10.703 α = 99.665° β = 97.393° γ = 108.539° Z = 2				
bis(4-bromopyridinium) hexabromoantimonate tribromide	(4-BrPyH)_{2}[SbBr_{6}](Br_{3})	monoclinic	P2_{1}/c	a 7.3255 b 20.667 c 16.5665 β 95.627°				
2,6-dichloropyridinium	(2,6-ClPyH)[SbBr_{4}]	monoclinic	P2/m	a=10.45 b=10.76 c=13.45 β=110.2 Z=4	1491	2.76	pale yellow	
2,6-dibromopyridinium	(2,6-BrPyH)_{3}[SbBr_{6}](Br_{3}) · 2H_{2}O	monoclinic	C2/c	a=32.8242 b=9.6155 c=14.7877 β=101.732°				
3,5-dichloropyridinium	(3,5-ClPyH)_{2}[SbBr_{5}]	orthorhombic	Pbca	a=21,77 b=8.14 c=24.38 Z=8	4320	2.52	deep yellow	
N-ethylpyridinium	EtPySbBr_{6}							
N-propylpyridinium	1-n-PrPySbBr_{6}	monoclinic	P2_{1}/n	a=7.3687 b=16.4706 c=13.8620 β=97.054 Z=4	1669.65			(1)
N-butylpyridinium	1-n=BuPySbBr_{6}	orthorhombic	P2_{1}2_{1}2_{1}	a=7.4277 b=14.1293 c=16.7699 Z=4	1760.0			(2)
2-aminopyridinium	[2-NH_{2}C_{5}H_{4}NH][SbBr_{4}]	monoclinic	P2_{1}/c	a 12.484 b 13.106 c 7.492 β 105.84° Z=4	1179.1	3.022	@100K phase transition at 396/412K	
4-aminopyridinium	(4-NH_{2}C_{5}H_{4}NH)SbBr_{4}	monoclinic	P2_{1}/c	a 11.548 b 14.029 c 7.432 β 93.19°			@220K	
tetrakis(2,2'-bipyridin-1-ium) tetrakis(μ-bromo)-hexadecabromo-tetra-antimony	(2,2′-bipyH)_{4}[Sb_{4}Br_{20}]	monoclinic	P2_{1}/c	a 14.5026 b 14.6945 c 16.5497 β 109.991°				
bis(pyridinium)ethane	(PyC_{2}){[SbBr_{6}](Br_{3})}	triclinic	P1̅	a=7.3269 b=9.1941 c=9.7994 α=64.474 β=80.207 γ=86.244 Z=1	586.99		cherry-red	
1,1′-(1,2-ethanediyl)bis(pyridine)	PyC_{2}^{2+}SbBr_{5}	triclinic	P1̅	a 10.1060 b 10.2956 c 11.1394 α 105.030° β 101.709° γ 117.233°				
1,1′-(1,2-ethanediyl)bis(3,5-dimethylpyridine)	3,5-MePyC_{2}^{2+}SbBr_{5}	monoclinic	P2/n	a 6.2898 b 8.7454 c 20.408 β 90.438°				
1,1′-(1,2-ethanediyl)bis(pyridine)	(C_{2}Py)_{2}[Sb_{2}Br_{10}]	triclinic	P1̅	a 6.1343 b 9.2857 c 17.2041 α 90.331° β 100.259° γ 99.912°				
1,1′-(1,2-ethanediyl)bis(pyridine)	(C_{2}Py)_{2}[Sb_{2}Br_{10}]	monoclinic	C2/c	a 19.6880 b 10.0152 c 20.8410 β 111.104°				
1,1′-(1,2-ethanediyl)bis(3,5-dimethylpyridine)	(3,5-MePy){[SbBr_{4}]}	monoclinic	P2_{1}/n	a 20.5536 b 7.2974 c 21.2510 β 117.694°				
bis(pyridinium)propane	(PyC_{3})_{2}[Sb_{2}Br_{9}][SbBr_{6}]	orthorhombic	Pmmm	a=20.3785 b=15.5018 c=7.4618 Z=2	2357.2		mixed III V valence	
bis(pyridinium)butane	(PyC_{4}){[SbBr_{6}](Br_{3})}	triclinic	P1̅	a=7.8627 b=9.1285 c=10.1514 α=68.392° β=89.669° γ=72.048° Z=1	639.63			
4-ethylpyridinium	(4−CH_{3}CH_{2}C_{5}H_{4}NH)_{3}Sb_{2}Br_{14}	orthorhombic	Pna2_{1}	Z=4		2.55	black; orange-red at −174°	
1,1′-(propane-1,3-diyl)bis(4-methylpyridin)-1-ium	(4-MePyC_{3})_{2}[SbBr_{6}]_{2}[Br_{5}]_{2}	monoclinic	P2_{1}/n	a=7.7157 b=16.1786 c=24.292 β=96.972°			Sb(V)	
propanediyl-bis(3-methylpyridinium)	(3-MePyC_{3})_{3}[Sb4Br16]	monoclinic	P2_{1}/n	a 11.6777 b 42.282 c 16.5504 β 95.618°				
1,1'-(ethane-1,2-diyl)bis(3-methylpyridin-1-ium)	(3-MePyC_{2})_{3}[Sb_{2}Br_{9}]_{2}	triclinic	P1̅	a 10.6368 b 10.8059 c 15.4810 α 76.034° β 81.735° γ 83.387°				
bis(1,1'-(butane-1,4-diyl)bis(3-methylpyridin-1-ium)) hexakis(μ-bromo)-decabromo-tetra-antimony(iii)	(3-MePyC_{4})_{3}[Sb4Br_{16}]	monoclinic	P2_{1}/n	a 14.2410 b 11.2731 c 19.0662 β 110.674°				
4,4'-dimethyl-1,1'-butanediylbis(pyridinium)	(4-MePyC_{4})[Sb_{2}Br_{8}]	monoclinic	P 2/c	a 26.313 b 6.4010 c 17.9886 β 109.026°				
4,4'-dimethyl-1,1'-butanediylbis(pyridinium)	(4-MePyC_{4})_{2}[Sb_{4}Br_{16}]	monoclinic	P2_{1}/n	a 11.4661 b 19.7236 c 12.5217 β 92.726°				
1,3,4-trimethylpyridin-1-ium	1,3,4-MePy[SbBr_{6}]	triclinic	P1̅	a 8.3195 b 8.9921 c 12.3360 α 86.146° β 76.520° γ 71.872°			Sb(V)	
1,4-dimethylpyridin-1-ium	1,4-MePy[SbBr_{6}]	triclinic	P1̅	a 7.6803 b 8.5900 c 12.6261 α 75.226° β 88.079° γ 79.872°			Sb(V)	
1,2-dimethylpyridinium	(1,2-MePy)_{2}[SbBr_{6}](Br_{3})	monoclinic	P2_{1}/n	a=7.3284 b=10.5875 c=16.7538 β=96.005°			Sb(V)	
1,3-dimethylpyridinium	(1,3-MePy)_{2}[SbBr_{6}](Br_{3})	triclinic	P1̅	a 7.2611 b 9.086 c 11.1895 α 67.617° β 87.457° γ 72.16°				(5)
2,4-dimethylpyridinium	?	orthorhombic	Pmmn	a=12.06 b=12.97 c=11.49	1797	2.2	yellow	
2,6-dimethylpyridinium	(2,6-MePy)_{3}[Sb_{2}Br_{9}]	monoclinic	P2_{1}/c	a=12.10 b=15.56 c=21.27 β=115.7 Z=4°	3629	2.36	pale yellow	
1-ethyl-3-methylpyridinium	(1-Et-3-MePy)_{2}[SbBr_{6}](Br_{3})	triclinic	P1̅	a 7.2472 b 9.4088 c 11.5541 α 69.263° β 81.162° γ 71.303°				
4-ethyl-1-methylpyridinium	(4-Et-1-MePy)_{2}[SbBr_{6}](Br_{3})	monoclinic	P2_{1}/n	a 8.4645 b 13.0802 c 13.1574 β 105.702°				
bis(2,6-dimethylpyridin-1-ium) hexabromo-antimony pentabromide	(2,6-MePy)_{2}[SbBr_{6}](Br_{5})	monoclinic	P2_{1}/c	a 7.4584 b 18.0860 c 21.626 β 93.607° Z=4	2911.4			(3)
bis(1,3,5-trimethylpyridin-1-ium) hexabromo-antimony tribromide	(1,3,5-MePy)_{2}[SbBr_{6}](Br_{3})	triclinic	P1̅	a 8.1964 b 8.2015 c 12.5202 α 92.883° β 103.923° γ 115.467° Z=4	1085.3		100K	(4)
2,4,6-trimethylpyridinium	(2,4,6-MePy)_{3}[Sb_{2}Br_{9}]	monoclinic	P2_{1}/n	a=10.36 b=42.36 c=9.09 β=100.2° Z=4	3926	2.25	yellow-tan	
2,4,6-trimethylpyridinium	(2,4,6-MePy)[SbBr]•0.5Br_{2}	monoclinic	P2_{1}/n	a 10.4938 b 13.6198 c 12.8807 β 90.339° Z=4	1840.9		100k	(5)
bis(3,5-dimethylpyridin-1-ium) hexabromo-antimony tribromide	(3,5--MePy)_{2}[SbBr_{6}](Br_{3})	orthorhombic	Pnnm	a 17.1097 b 10.4401 c 7.3438 Z=2	1311.8			(2)
bis(1-ethyl-3-methylpyridinium) hexabromoantimonate tribromide	(1-Et-3-MePy)_{2}[SbBr_{6}](Br_{3})	triclinic	P1̅	a 7.2472 b 9.4088 c 11.5541 α 69.263° β 81.162° γ 71.303°				
1-ethyl-4-methylpyridin-1-ium	(1-Et-4-MePy)_{2}[SbBr_{6}](Br_{3})	monoclinic	P2_{1}/n	a=11.4927 b=7.3613 c=16.9266 β=100.782°			Sb(V)	
1-ethyl-2-methylpyridin-1-ium	(1-Et-2-MePy)_{2}[SbBr_{6}](Br_{3})	monoclinic	P2_{1}/n	a=8.3421 b=13.196 c=13.183 β=105.40°			Sb(V)	
1-ethyl-2,6-dimethylpyridin-1-ium hexabromoantimonate	(1-Et-2,6-MePy)[SbBr_{6}]	monoclinic	P2_{1}/c	a 9.9470 b 11.5017 c 16.4632 β 107.201°				
	(PyC_{3})_{3}[Sb_{2}Br_{9}]_{2}							
	(PyC_{4})[Sb_{2}Br_{8}]							
	(PyC_{5})_{2}[α-Sb_{4}Br_{16}]							
	(PyC_{6})_{2}[Sb_{2}Br_{10}]							
	(4-MePyC_{2})_{2}[Sb_{2}Br_{10}]							
	(4‑MePyC_{3})_{2}[α-Sb_{4}Br_{16}]							
	(4-MePyC_{5})_{2}[α-Sb_{4}Br_{16}]							
1-benzylpyridin-1-ium hexabromoantimonate	C_{6}H_{5}CH_{2}PySbBr_{6}	orthorhombic	Pnma	a=12.6594 b=17.3414 c=8.6389 Z=4	1896.5			(6)
bis(1-benzyl-2-methylpyridinium) hexabromoantimonate tribromide	(CH_{3}-C_{6}H_{5}CH_{2}Py)_{2}SbBr_{6}(Br_{3})	triclinic	P1̅	a 8.9834 b 10.2599 c 10.3601 α 94.223° β 102.737° γ 111.846°				(7)
bis(1-(4-bromobenzyl)pyridinium) hexabromoantimonate tribromide	(BrC_{6}H_{4}CH_{2}Py)_{2}SbBr_{6}(Br_{3})	monoclinic	P2_{1}/c	a 8.6483 b 15.1885 c 13.3520 β 98.887°				
2,2'-bipyridinium pentabromoantimonate (III)	(2,2'-C_{10}H_{8}N_{2}H_{2})SbBr_{5}	monoclinic	P2_{1}/c	a = 14.575 b = 14.726 c = 16.775 β = 110.34° Z = 8				
4,4'-bipyridinium pentabromoantimonate (III)	(4,4'-C_{10}H_{8}N_{2}H_{2})SbBr_{5}	triclinic	P1	a = 11.28.7 b = 10.121 c = 8.548 α = 98.94° β = 101.06° γ = 113.57° Z = 2				
imidazolium	(C_{3}N_{2}H_{5})_{3}SbBr_{6}.H_{2}O	monoclinic	P2_{1}/c	a=8.9137 b=19.2032 c=12.7984 β=90.650°				
imidazolium	(C_{3}N_{2}H_{5})_{5}Sb_{2}Br_{11}	monoclinic	P2_{1}/n	a 9.1399 b 15.150 c 13.969 β 96.19°			ferroelectric Curie Point 145K; 4 phases	
thiazolium	(C_{3}H_{4}NS)_{6}Sb_{4}Br_{18}·2H_{2}O	triclinic	P1̅	a 11.060 b 11.465 c 12.957 α 116.21° β 100.71° γ 98.87°				
quinolinium		monoclinic	Cc	a=15.28 b=14.04 c=7.44 β =118.3 Z=4	1405	2.70	light yellow	
quinolinium	(C_{9}H_{7}NH)_{2}SbBr_{9}	monoclinic	P2_{1}/n	as=7.518 b=11.316 c=16.351 β =97.41 Z=2			Sb(V)	
3-Bromoquinolinium	(3-BrQuinH)_{4}[Sb_{2}Br_{10}]	monoclinic	C2/c	a 15.3947 b 13.7967 c 22.8880 β 92.039°				2
5-Bromoquinolinium	(5-BrQuinH)_{2}[SbBr_{5}]	monoclinic	C2/c	a 23.8681 b 12.2567 c 8.6474 β 106.128°				3
3-Bromo-1-methylquinolinium	(1-Me-3-BrQuin)_{3}[Sb_{3}Br_{12}]	triclinic	P1̅	a 9.8582 b 11.7183 c 21.6576, α 98.981° β 96.402° γ 92.371°				5
isoquinolinium	isoquinHSbBr_{4}	monoclinic	P2_{1}/a	a=13.11 b=14.14 c=7.57 β=91.4 Z=4	1403	2.71	light tan	
N-methyl quinolinium	(N-MeQuin)_{2}{[SbBr_{6}](Br_{3})}	triclinic	P1̅	a=8.0902 b=8.5656 c=11.6475 𝛼 = 68.901° β = 79.204° 𝛾 = 77.120° Z=1	728.98			
N-methyl isoquinolinium	(N-MeIsoquin)_{2}{[SbBr_{6}](Br_{3})}	monoclinic	P2_{1}/c	a=12.9656 b=9.3423 c=12.5920 β = 107.233° Z=2	1456.8			
N-ethyl quinolinium	(N-EtQuin)[SbBr_{6}]	orthorhombic	Pnma	a=14.5122 b=11.4005 c=11.2135° Z=4	1855.2			
tris(6-methylquinolinium) hexabromoantimonate(III)	(6-MeQuin)_{3}[SbBr_{6}]							
2-methyl-1,3-benzoxazole	SbBr_{5}(boxH)_{2}	triclinic	P1̅	a=8.560 b=11.008 c=12.751 α=102.836° β=106.173° γ=93.398°				
quinuclidinium	(C_{9}H_{7}NH)_{2}Sb^{V}Br_{9}	monoclinic	P2_{1}/n	a=7.518 b=11.316 c=16.351 β=97.41° Z=2		2.67	red	
quinuclidinium	(C_{7}H_{13}NH)_{4}Sb^{III}Sb^{V}Br_{12}.2Br_{2}	cubic	Fm3m	a=13.873	2670	2.45	black	
3-ammoniumpropyl imidazolium pentabromoantimonate (III)	[C_{6}H_{13}N_{3}]^{2+}[SbBr_{5}]^{2−}	orthorhombic	P2_{1}2_{1}2_{1}	8.7120 b = 12.6608 c = 14.3498 Z = 4				
homopiperazinium	(C_{5}H_{14}N_{2})_{3}{Sb_{2}Br_{9}}_{2}	triclinic	P1	a = 9.4203 b = 10.0299 c = 15.1993 α=95.869 β= 105.941 γ= 113.318 Z=1	1231.36	3.010	yellow	
1,1'-(propane-1,3-diyl)bis(3-chloropyridinium) hexabromoantimonate tribromide	(3-ClPy^{+})_{2}CH_{2}CH_{2}CH_{2}		P2_{1}2_{1}2_{1}	a=10.807 b=15.720 c=7.775 Z=2	1320.8	2.791	red	
1,1'-(propane-1,3-diyl)bis(3-bromopyridinium) hexabromoantimonate tribromide	(3-BrPy^{+})_{2}CH_{2}CH_{2}CH_{2}		P2_{1}2_{1}2_{1}	a=10.9038 b=15.768 c=7.7704 Z=2	1336.0	2.981	red	
trihydroxonium enneabromidodiantimonate(III)	(H_{3}O)_{3}Sb_{2}Br_{9}	monoclinic	P2_{1}/n	a = 13.4679 b = 7.6319 c = 19.1397 β = 90.240° Z=4	1967.3	3.443	yellow	
hexabromoantimonic(V) acid trihydrate	HSbBr_{6} · 3H_{2}O	monoclinic	P2_{1}/c	a = 7.110 b = 13.532 c = 12.846 β = 94.87 Z=4			melt 330K	
tetramethylphosphonium	[(CH_{3})_{4}P]_{3}[Sb_{2}Br_{9}]	hexagonal	P3_{1}/c	a 9.7931 c 22.697			deep yellow	
trimethylphosphonium	[(CH_{3})_{3}PH][SbBr_{4}]	monoclinic	P2_{1}/c	a=10.9103 b=19.8342 c=11.3617 β=100.744 Z=4	2415.54	2.851	colourless	
Methyltriphenylphosphonium	(MTP)_{6}SbBr_{6}Sb_{2}Br_{9}⋅H_{2}O	trigonal	R3	a=19.7793 c=27.2770 Z=3	9241	1.749		
Methyltriphenylphosphonium	(MTP)_{2}SbBr_{5}	monoclinic	P2_{1}/c	a=12.7399 b=12.3833 c=26.0206 β=96.373 Z=4	4079.7	1.752		
tetraphenylphosphonium	P(C_{6}H_{5})_{4}SbBr_{6}	monoclinic	C2/c	a = 16.887 b = 7.357 c = 23.367 β = 93.98° Z=4	2896.1		yellow	
triphenyl(9-phenyl-9H-carbazol-3-yl) phosphonium antimony bromide	TPPcarzSbBr_{4}	triclinic	P1̅	a=9.77183 b=11.42472 16.15939 α=88.2199° β=80.7810° γ=71.8474°, Z = 2	1691.77	1.857	red LED	
Tetraphenylphosphonium Ikosioctabromooctaantimonate(III)	(PPh_{4})_{4}Sb_{8}Br_{28}	triclinic	P1̅	a=12.491 b=13.078 c=21.523 α=102.93° β=100.83° γ= 100.42°, Z = 2	3273	2.318		
Tris-Chlorobromophosphazeno-carbenium	[C(NP(Br_{0,78}Cl_{0,22})_{3})_{3}]SbBr_{6}	orthorhombic	Pbca	a = 27.92 b = 11.23 c = 17.54 Z = 8				
(3-phenylpropyl)(triphenyl)phosphonium	(PPTPP)_{2}[Sb_{2}Br_{8}]	monoclinic	C2/c	a=27.852 b=11.4355 c=24.209 β =131.58° Z=8	5767		pale yellow	
(3-phenylpropyl)(triphenyl)phosphonium	(PPTPP)_{2}[SbBr_{5}]	monoclinic	P2_{1}	a=9.7702 b=20.1661 c=13.3581 β=94.402° Z=2	2624.14		pale yellow	
	Rb_{3}Sb_{2}Br_{9}	monoclinic	P2_{1}/n					
	Rb_{4}Sb_{2}Br_{12}	tetragonal	I4_{1}/amd	a = 10.70 and c = 21.69 Z=8		4.17	black	
	Rb_{7}Sb_{3}Br_{16}	orthorhombic	Cmcm	a = 23.4716 b = 13.57.89 c = 35.3947			yellow	
	[RuNOPy_{4}Br]_{4}[Sb_{2}Br_{8}][Sb_{3}Br_{12}]_{2}	monoclinic	P2_{1}/c	a=12.021 b=22.454 c=26.372 β=92.506° Z=8	7112	2.634	light orange	
1,4-bis(ammoniomethyl)cyclohexane	(C_{8}H_{20}N_{2})_{2}AgMBr_{8}	triclinic	P1̅	a 8.0820 b 8.161 c 11.814 α 90.185° β 95.390° γ 90.121°			band gap 2.600 eV	
histammonium	(HIS)_{2}AgSbBr_{8}	monoclinic	C2/c	a=11.5632 b=12.2529 c=18.694 β=94.264 Z=4	2641.3	2.754	semiconductor; pale yellow	
	Cs_{3}Sb_{2}Br_{9}			a=7.9165 c=9.7139			yellow; orange at 300 °C; perovskite	
	Cs_{4}Sb_{2}Br_{12}	tetragonal	I4_{1}/amd	a=10.842 c=21.913 Z=2	2576		black @300K	
	Cs_{2}AgSbBr_{6}	cubic	Fm3̅m	a = 11.1583 Z=4	1389.2	4.661	black; bandgap 1.64 eV	
Benzeneethanammonium	(C_{8}NH_{12})_{4}Bi_{0.57}Sb_{0.43}Br_{7}⋅H_{2}O	triclinic	P1̅	a=13.0207 b=13.1304 c=13.3192 α=93.818° β=102.408° γ=108.610° Z=2	2085.1	1.971	light green	
