= Phosphide iodide =

Class of chemical compounds

Phosphide iodides or iodide phosphides are compounds containing anions composed of iodide (I^{−}) and phosphide (P^{3−}). They can be considered as mixed anion compounds. They are in the category of pnictidehalides. Related compounds include the phosphide chlorides, arsenide iodides antimonide iodides and phosphide bromides.

Phosphorus can form clusters or chains in these compounds, so that some are 1-dimensional or fibrous.

Phosphide iodides are often metallic, black or dark red in colour.

== List ==
formula	system	space group	unit cell Å	volume	density	comment	ref
[Si_{40}P_{6}]I_{6.5}	cubic	Pm3̅n	a=10.1293 Z=1	1039.3	3.412	clathrate	
K_{4}P_{21}I	orthorhombic	Ccmm	a = 12.853; b = 21.795; c = 9.748 Z = 4	2730.7	2.271	ruby red;sensitive to air	
Ca_{2}PI	trigonal	R3̅m	a=4.30 c=22.17		3.2	yellow	
Ca_{3}PI_{3}	cubic	I4_{1}32	a=12.31 Z=8		3.78	colourless	
Cu_{2}P_{3}I_{2}	monoclinic	P2_{1}c	a = 15.343, b = 12.925, c = 15.260, β = 116.38°, Z = 16			band gap 0.72 eV; Cu ion conductor	
Cu_{3}P_{15}I_{2}	monoclinic	P2_{1}/n	a=9.667, b=19.475, c=9.886, β =108.75(2)°, Z=4	1762.4		grey	
(CuI)_{3}P_{12}	monoclinic	P2_{1}	a=12.846 b=13.857 c=9.651 β=109.43 Z=4	1620.2	3.866	shiny	
(CuI)_{2}P_{14}	monoclinic	P2_{1}/c	a = 9.919, b = 9.718, c = 16.478, β = 105.71°, Z = 4	1529.0	3.539		
(CuI)_{5}P_{16}S							
(CuI)_{3}P_{4}S_{4}	hexagonal	P6_{3}cm	a=19.082, c=6.691 Z=6	2109.9			
(CuI)_{8}P_{12}	monoclinic	P12_{1}/c1	a=15.343, b=12.925, c=15.26, β=116.38		4.64		
Ge_{38}P_{8}I_{8}	Cubic	P4̅3n	a=10.507			silvery	
(CuI)_{5}P_{16}Se							
(CuI)_{2}P_{8}Se_{3}		Pbcm	a=9.1348 b=12.351 c=13.873 Z=4	1565.2	3.673	red; melt 408 °C; P_{8}Se_{3} clusters	
(CuI)_{3}P_{4}Se_{4}	hexagonal	P6_{3}cm	a = 19.601, c = 6.7196, Z = 6			orange	
Zn_{3}PI_{3}	cubic	F4̅2m	a=5.945		4.87	dark grey; dec 300 °C	
(ZnI_{2})_{6}ZnSP_{4}S_{3}							
(ZnI_{2})_{6}ZnSeP_{4}Se_{3}	cubic	F4̅3c	a=19.542	7463.1	4.325	brown	
Rb_{4}P_{21}I	orthorhombic	Ccmm	a = 13.281; b = 21.868; c = 9.771 Z=4	2838.1	2.619	dark red	
Sr_{2}P_{7}I	cubic	P2_{1}3	a=10.25			dark red; contains heptaphosphanortricyclane	
Zr_{6}I_{14}P	orthorhombic	Cmca					
Ag_{2}P_{3}I_{2}	monoclinic					Ag ion conductor	
(AgI)_{2}Ag_{3}PS_{4}	hexagonal	P6_{3}mc	a=7.395 c=12.224 Z=2	579.1		Ag ion conductor	
Cd_{2}P_{3}I	monoclinic	C2/c	a=8.255 b=9.304 c=7.514 β =99.66				
Cd_{3}PI_{3}	hexagonal	P6_{3}mc				band gap 2.44 eV	
Cd_{4}P_{2}I_{3}	orthorhombic	Pbca	a=12.890 b=12.725 c=12.654			P_{2}^{4−}	
SnIP						soft and flexible; double helix SnI+ and P−; band gap 1.9 eV	
Sn_{24}P_{19.3}I_{8}	cubic	Pm3̅n	a=10.9554				
Sn_{24}P_{19.3}Br_{x}I_{8−x}	cubic	Pm3̅n					
Sn_{24}P_{19.3(2)}Cl_{y}I_{8−y} (y ≤ 0.8)	cubic	Pm3̅n					
Sn_{20}Zn_{4}P_{20.8}I_{8}	cubic	Pm3̅n	a=10.883 Z=1				
Sn_{17}Zn_{7}P_{22}I_{8}	cubic	Pm3̅n	a=10.8458 Z=1				
Sn_{14}In_{10}P_{22}I_{8}	cubic	Pm3̅n	a=11.0450 Z=1	1347.4	5.535	black	
Sn_{14}In_{10}P_{21.2}I_{8}		P4_{2}/m	a=24.745, c=11.067, Z=5	6776	5.521	black	
[Ge_{30.5}Sn_{7.7}P_{7.75}]I_{7.88}	cubic	Pm3̅n	a=10.721 Z=1				
Sn_{24}As_{x}P_{19.3−x}I_{8}	cubic	Pm3̅n	a = 10.9358—11.1495				
Cs_{0.35}Zr_{6}I_{14}P	orthorhombic	Cmca	a=15.934 b=14.287 c=12.939 Z=4			black	
Ba_{2}P_{7}I	monoclinic	P2_{1}/m	a=6.3538 b=6.8990 c=12.0392 β =95.515 Z=2	524.93	3.912	orange-yellow; water sensitive	
Ba_{3}P_{3}I_{2}	orthorhombic	Pnma	a = 17.195, b = 4.624, c = 14.272, Z = 4,				
Ba_{5}P_{5}I_{3}	monoclinic	C2/m	a = 42.664, b = 4.56.3, c = 9.431, β = 92.20, Z = 4				
La_{2}PI_{2}	trigonal	P3̅m1	a=4.236 c=10.121 Z=1	157.25	4.95		
Eu_{2}PI		R3m	a = 4.445, c = 23.12.6, Z = 3				
Eu_{2}P_{7}I	cubic	P2_{1}3				dark red; contains heptaphosphanortricyclane; band gap 1.7 eV	
Au_{7}P_{10}I	trigonal	P3̅1m	a=6.180 c=11.122 Z=1				
Hg_{9}P_{5}I_{6}	monoclinic		a=13.112 b=12.486 c=17.031 β=119.90				
Hg_{4}ZnPI_{4}	monoclinic	P2_{1}	a = 7.850, b = 12.719, c = 7.861, β = 119.52°, Z = 2			like Millon phases	
Hg_{7}Ag_{2}P_{8}I_{6}	monoclinic	C1_{2}/m1	a=13.146 b=11.037 c=8.336 β=102.210 Z=2	1182.1	7.386	black	
Hg_{12}Ag_{41}P_{88}I_{41}	cubic	Fm3̅	a=26.705 Z=4	19045	5.147	dark red; air stable; P_{11}^{3−} clusters	
HgAg_{6}P_{20}I_{2}	monoclinic	P2_{1}/m	a = 6.718, b = 27.701, c = 7.383, β = 113.98°, Z = 2				
