= American University Preparatory School =

Coordinates: 34.054629°N 118.255559°W

- Creating Scholars and Global Leaders
- 345 South Figueroa Street, Los Angeles, California; United States

Information
- Type: Private secondary
- Motto: Bringing the World to Los Angeles
- Opened: 2014
- Headmaster: Gary W. Woods
- Faculty: 13
- Grades: 9–12
- Enrollment: 47
- Campus type: Metropolitan
- Colors: Primary: blue and orange ; secondary: teal and marigold
- Mascot: Trailblazers
- Website: www.aupschool.org

American University Preparatory School (commonly referred to as AUP) is a private, for-profit, four-year, co-educational boarding and day college preparatory high school for grades 9–12 located in Los Angeles, California, at the center of downtown Los Angeles. Its curricular focus is on Global Studies & Citizenship, Digital Media Arts, Computer Science, Leadership, and Entrepreneurship in the 21st century.

== Campus ==
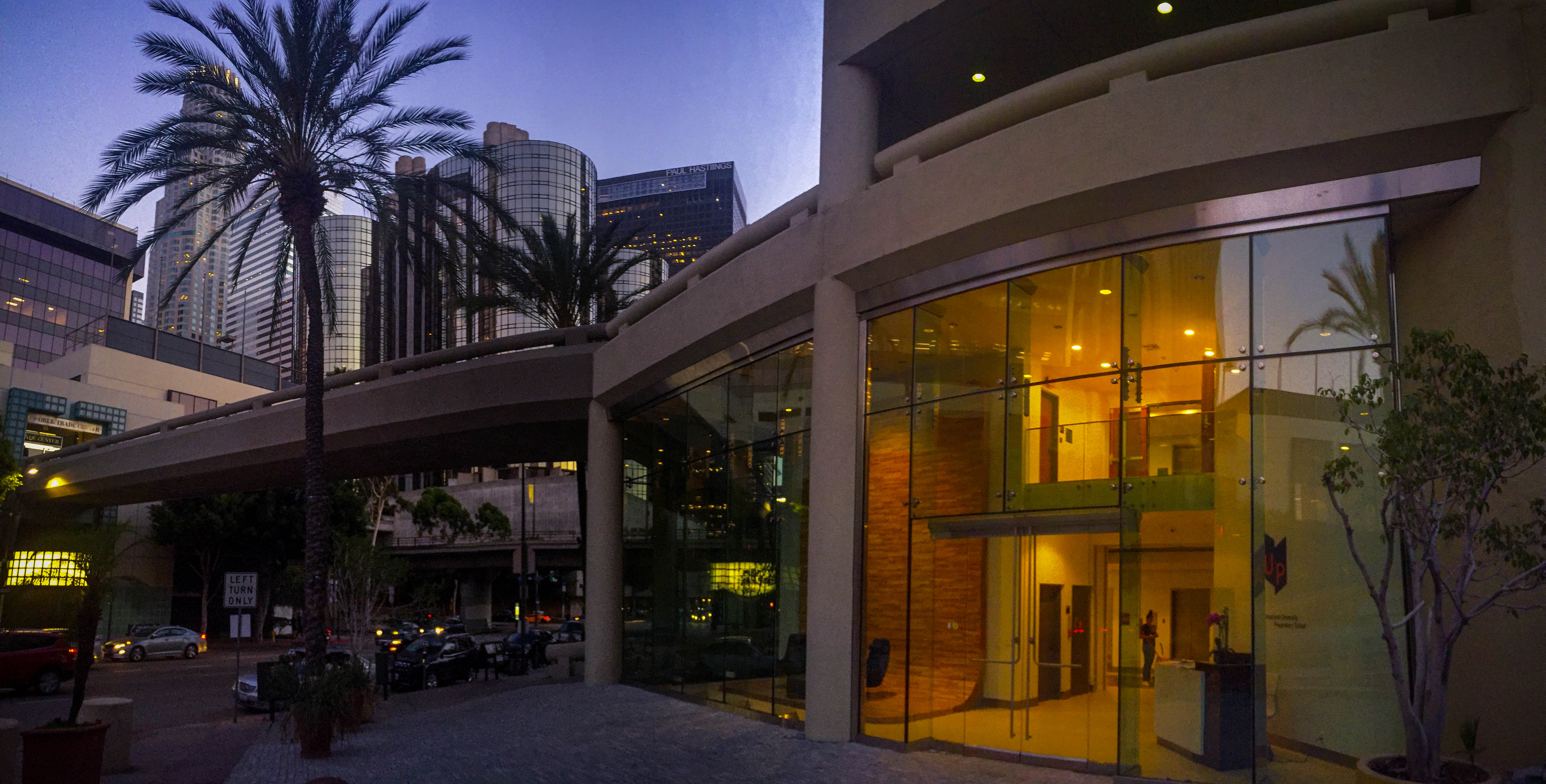
Front of School Building in Downtown Los Angeles.

American University Preparatory School is located in downtown Los Angeles. The school's main facility is located across from the World Trade Center on Figueroa St., and the school partners with surrounding facilities for student usage. Notably, AUP is the academic home to some of the Music Academy students of the Colburn School, and AUP students may attend music classes at the Colburn School. Students also utilize the Downtown Public Library.
