= Uup RNA motif =

uup
- Consensus secondary structure and sequence conservation of uup RNA

Identifiers
- Symbol: uup
- Rfam: RF03060

Other data
- RNA type: Cis-reg
- SO: SO:0005836
- PDB structures: PDBe

The uup RNA motif is a conserved RNA structure that was discovered by bioinformatics. uup motif RNAs are found in Bacillota and Gammaproteobacteria.

uup motif RNAs likely function as cis-regulatory elements, in view of their positions upstream of protein-coding genes. uup RNAs are consistently found upstream of genes encoding an ATPase. The precise role of these ATPases is not known, but they are usually predicted to either function as part of an ATP-binding cassette transporter or as fungal elongation factor 3. In some cases, the ATPase genes downstream of uup RNAs seem to be transcribed as part of a larger operon. In a handful of these cases, one of the operon's genes encodes the DUF2992 conserved protein domain. This gene is, in turn, regulated by the yjdF RNA motif, which might function to sense azaaromatic compounds.

uup RNAs are usually located 100 nucleotides upstream of predicted Rho-independent transcription terminators. Since these transcription terminators are located somewhat far away, it is not clear that they are functionally related. If uup RNAs do function as cis-regulatory elements, they might inhibit the formation of the transcription terminator's secondary structure in order to control the expression of the downstream gene.

The hypothesis that uup RNAs correspond to riboswitches has been considered. These RNAs exhibit several highly conserved nucleotide positions, despite a wide distribution in two bacteria phyla. However, the secondary structure of these RNAs was considered unusually simple compared to most (but not all) known riboswitch structures.
