= Airspace Use Plan =

Air traffic control status message

The Airspace Use Plan (or AUP) is defined as "an Airspace Management (ASM) message of NOTAM status notifying the daily decision of an Airspace Management Cell (AMC) on the temporary allocation of the airspace within its jurisdiction for a specific time period, by means of a standard message format." AUPs are issued at least on a daily basis.

An AUP can be updated or superseded through an Updated Airspace Use Plan (UUP).

== Sources ==
- Eurocontrol ATM Lexicon:AUP
- Eurocontrol ATM Lexicon:UUP
