= Phosphide chloride =

Class of chemical compounds

A Phosphide chloride is a mixed anion compound containing both phosphide (P^{3−}) and chloride (Cl^{−}) ions.

A common structural element is P_{7}^{3−} which is called heptaphosphanortricyclane with a formal IUPAC name of heptaphosphatricyclo[2.2.1.0^{2,6}]heptane.

Group 12 elements, cadmium and mercury are in most of the known compounds.

== List ==
name	formula	formula weight	crystal system	space group	unit cell Å	volume	density	comments	ref
	Ca_{3}PCl_{3}		cubic	Pm3̅m	a=5.713 Z=1	186.48	2.29		
	Cu_{6}PS_{5}Cl	607.96	cubic	P4̅3m	a=9.6962 Z=4	911.6	4.430	red	
	Sr_{2}PCl		cubic		a=6.18				
	Sr_{2}P_{7}Cl		monoclinic	C2/c	a=14.571 b=12.212 c=22.292 β=103.740° Z=16	3853	3.948	P_{7}^{3–}, clusters	
	Ag_{6}PS_{5}Cl		cubic	P4̅3m	a=10.3514 Z=4	1109.2	5.234	orange	
	α-Cd_{3}PCl_{3}		hexagonal		a=7.63 c=7.13			pale yellow >530 °C or quenched	
	β-Cd_{3}PCl_{3}		monoclinic		a=6.99 b=7.97 c=7.38 β=118.1°			pale yellow <530 °C	
	Cd_{4}P_{2}Cl_{3}	617.89	cubic	Pa3̅	a=12.1474 Z=8	1792.5	4.579	yellow; band gap 2.36 eV	
	Cd_{2}P_{3}Cl		monoclinic	C2/c	a=7.98 b=8.98 c=7.55 β=			brown; band gap 1.87	
	Cd_{2}PCl_{2}		monoclinic	P2_{1}/n	a=7.736 b=8.957 c=7.880 β=118.92° Z=4	477.93	4.540	yellow	
	Cd_{7}P_{4}Cl_{6}		cubic	Pa3̅	a=11.93			light green	
	Ba_{2}P_{7}Cl		monoclinic	P2_{1}/m	a = 11.726, b = 6.829, c = 6.337, β = 95.27°, Z = 2			P_{7}^{3–}, clusters	
	La_{3}Zn_{4}P_{6}Cl		orthorhombic	Cmcm	a= 4.0576 b 13.632 c 21.547 Z=4	1191.8	5.013	black; thermal conductivity 0.7 Wm^{−1} K^{−1} (low)	
	Eu_{2}PCl		cubic	Fm3m	a = 6.106, Z = 2				
	W_{6}PCl_{17}		orthorhombic	Imm2	a=6.7835 b=15.8762 c=10.0727 Z=2	1084.79	5.3168	black	
	W_{4}(PCl)Cl_{10}		monoclinic	C2/m	a=13.257 b=9.850 c=11.400 β=91.38 Z=4	1488.2	5.161	black; chloro-phosphinidene ligand	
	[Hg_{4}P_{2}][HfCl_{6}]		orthorhombic	Pbca	a=12.919 b=13.263 c=16.239 Z=8	2783	5.994	yellow	
	Hg_{2}PCl_{2}		monoclinic	I2/m	a=7.643,b=7.977,c=8.539,β=115.23°,Z=4	469.8	7.113	yellow	
	Hg_{2}P_{3}Cl		monoclinic	C2/c	a = 7.834, b = 8.844, c = 7.591, β = 98.68°, Z = 4				
	[Hg_{6}P_{4}](TiCl_{6})Cl		cubic	Pa3̅	a=11.7675, Z=4	1627.2	6.627	black or dark brown	
	(Hg_{6}P_{4})(CrCl_{6})Cl	1627.57	cubic	Pa3̅	a=11.7364 Z=4	1616.6	6.687	yellow; resistivity is humidity sensitive	
	(Hg_{6}P_{4})(CuCl_{3})_{2}		monoclinic	C2/c	a=23.633 b=8.956 c=14.248 β =124.213° Z=6	2493.9	6.660	pinkish-red; ferroelectric below 37 K: 114 μC m^{−2}	
	(Hg_{23}P_{12})(ZnCl_{4})_{6}		hexagonal	P6̅2m	a=12.9774 c=11.749 Z=1	1713.6	6.035	yellow	
	(Hg_{11}P_{4})(GaCl_{4})_{4}		monoclinic	C2/m	a=12.762 b=7.353 c=22.040 β=100.32 Z=2	2034.7	5.185	yellow	
	[Hg_{4}P_{2}][ZrCl_{6}]		orthorhombic	Pbca	a=12.899 b=13.255 c=16.196 Z=8	2769.1	5.604	yellow	
	Hg_{4}Ag5P_{8}Cl_{5}		orthorhombic	Cmcm	a=11.1426 b=14.5064 c=11.8444 Z=4	1914.5	6.129	high temp	
	Hg_{4}Ag5P_{8}Cl_{5}		monoclinic	C2/m	a=14.490 b=10.904 c=6.2863 β=104.094 Z=2	963.4	6.090		
	[Hg_{6}P_{4}Cl_{3}](SnCl_{3})		cubic	P2_{1}3	a = 11.865 Z=4				
	(Hg_{6}P_{4}Cl_{3})(PbCl_{3})		cubic	P2_{1}3	a=11.8837 Z=4	1678.24	6.916	yellow	
