= Antimony germanides =

Compounds containing germanium and antimony plus at least one metal

Antimony germanides or antimonide germanides are compounds containing germanium and antimony along with one or more metals. Bonding is only partially ionic, and can be considered as a Zintl phase, rather than antimonide ions with germanide ions. There are often covalent bonds between the antimony, reducing its apparent valence.

Some of the compounds have varying ratios of antimony and germanium. For example at 600 °C Gd_{5}Sb_{3} and Gd_{5}Ge_{3} can form a solid solution.

Gold does not form a ternary compound, and neither does gallium or bismuth.

Germanium containing antimonides have been investigated for use in thermoelectric materials.

== Production ==
Antimonide germanide compounds can be made by heating a mixture of the powdered elements together at 600° or higher. Tantalum is used as the crucible material, as it does not react. Oxygen must be excluded to stop oxides from forming.

== Related ==
Related compounds include substitution of germanium with other elements from group 13 or 14: SiSb, SnSb, PbSb, AlSb, GaSb, and InSb. Replacing antimony with other pnictides can form related compounds such as phosphidosilicates, arsenidosilicates, phosphidogermanates, arsenidogermanates, phosphidostannates, arsenidostannates, phosphidoplumbates, and arsenidoplumbates.

== List ==
formula	system	space group	unit cell	volume	density	comment	ref
TiGeSb	tetragonal	P4/nmm	a = 3.7022 c = 8.214 Z = 2	112.58			
Fe_{3}Ge_{2}Sb	hexagonal	P6/mmm	a = 8.9070 c = 7.9217				
FeGe_{1−𝑥}⁢Sb_{𝑥} x<0.05	hexagonal	P6/mmm					
FeGe_{1−𝑥}⁢Sb_{𝑥} 0.1<x<0.2	hexagonal	P6_{3}/mmm					
Ti_{0.5}Fe_{6}Ge_{5}Sb	hexagonal	P6/mmm	a=8.845 c=7.9785 Z=3				
Cr_{0.8}Fe_{5.3}Ge_{5.2}Sb_{0.8}	hexagonal	P6/mmm	a=8.850 c=8.025 Z=3				
Mn_{1.8}Fe_{4.6}Ge_{4.9}Sb_{1.1}	hexagonal	P6/mmm	a=8.910 c=7.9665 Z=3				
CoGe_{x}Sb_{1-x}	hexagonal	P6_{3}/mmm				Ge and Sb disordered	
Co_{3}Ge_{2}Sb	hexagonal	P6/mmm	a = 8.913 c = 7.6312 Z = 6				
Cu_{6}GeSb	hexagonal	P6_{3}/mmc	a=4.16, c=7.47				
Ge_{2}GaSb	cubic					gallium antimonide and germanium forma solid solution	
Y_{5}Sb_{2}Ge_{2}							
ZrGeSb							
ZrGe_{0.211}Sb_{1.78}	orthorhombic	Pnma	a = 7.304 b = 3.9513 c = 9.576 Z=4	276.35	7.763		
NbGeSb	tetragonal	P4/nmm	a=3.75 c=8.30				
ZnIn_{18}GeSb_{20}							
La_{5}Ge_{3}Sb	hexagonal	P6_{3}/mcm	a=9.156 c=7.231 Z=2	525.0			
La_{6}Ge_{2.8}Sb_{13.2}	orthorhombic	Immm	a = 4.3034 b = 10.851 c = 27.073 Z=2	1272.6		Metallic; columns of trigonal prisms	
La_{12}Ge6.6Sb_{21}	orthorhombic	Immm	a=4.3165 b=15.205 c=34.443 Z=2				
Ce_{2}GeSb_{3}	orthorhombic	Cmmm				Sb ZigZag chain	
Ce_{3}GeSb							
Ce_{5}Ge_{3}Sb_{2}							
Ce_{6}Ge_{5}Sb_{12}	orthorhombic	Immm	a=4.2972 b=10.740 c=26.791 Z=2	1236.4		Metallic; columns of trigonal prisms	
Ce_{12}Ge_{5.2}Sb_{2}_{6.8}		C222	a=8.6075 b=21.5154 c=26.8227	4967.4	7.117		
Pr_{6}Ge_{5}Sb_{12}	orthorhombic	Immm	a=4.2574 b=10.677 c=26.626 Z=2	1213.1		Metallic; columns of trigonal prisms	
Pr_{12}Ge_{6.48}Sb_{21}	orthorhombic	Immm	a=4.2578 b=114.9777 c=33.938 Z=2	2164.3	7.240		
Nd_{6}Ge_{3.61}Sb_{12.4}	orthorhombic	Immm	a = 4.2310 b = 10.6362 c = 26.526 Z=2	1197.8		Metallic; columns of trigonal prisms	
Sm_{6}Ge_{5}Sb_{12}	orthorhombic	Immm	a=4.1932 b=10.537 c=26.350 Z=2	1164.5		Metallic; columns of trigonal prisms	
Gd_{4}Ge_{1.97}Sb_{1.03}	cubic	I4̅3d	a=9.0111				
Gd_{5}Ge_{0.9}Sb_{3.1}	orthorhombic	Cmce	a = 12.241, b = 8.025, c = 8.039 Z=4		8.539	light grey	
Gd_{2}Ge_{3.28}Sb_{0.65}	orthorhombic	Cmcm	a = 4.0198, b = 30.373, c = 4.1340 Z=4		8.440	grey	
Gd_{6}Ge_{4.3}Sb_{11.7}	orthorhombic	Immm	a = 4.1509 b = 10.4438 c = 26.2400 Z=2	1136.7		Metallic; columns of trigonal prisms	
Gd_{8}Ge_{13.29}Sb_{1.72}	orthorhombic	Cmcm	a = 4.02832 b =30.4101 c = 4.14426 Z=1	507.68	7.953		
Gd_{1.02} Sc_{0.98}Ge_{0.9}Sb_{0.1}	tetragonal	I4/mmm	a=4.2730 c=15.658			ferromagnetic < 333K	
Gd_{1.02} Sc_{0.98}Ge_{0.5}Sb_{0.5}	tetragonal	I4/mmm	a=4.3277 c=15.904			ferromagnetic < 170K	
Gd_{1.02} Sc_{0.98}Ge_{0.2}Sb_{0.8}	tetragonal	P4/nmm	a=4.3192 c=8.1461				
Tb_{6}Ge_{5}Sb_{12}	orthorhombic	Immm	a=4.1305 b=10.393 c=26.139 Z=2	1122.1		Metallic; columns of trigonal prisms	
Dy_{6}Ge_{5}Sb_{12}	orthorhombic	Immm	a=4.103 b=10.345 c=26.014 Z=2	1104.2		Metallic; columns of trigonal prisms	
Dy_{5}Sb_{2}Ge_{2}	orthorhombic	Cmca					
Ho_{5}Sb_{2}Ge_{2}	orthorhombic	Cmca					
Er_{5}Sb_{2}Ge_{2}	orthorhombic	Cmca					
Tm_{5}Sb_{2}Ge_{2}	orthorhombic	Cmca					
Yb_{8}Ge_{3}Sb_{5}	tetragonal	I4/mmm	a=15.8965 c=6.8206 Z=4	1723.6	8.520	metallic silver; ^{1}_{∞}(Ge_{3})^{4-}; negative thermal expansion under 15 K	
CaYb_{4}Al_{2}Sb_{5.8}Ge_{0.2}	orthorhombic						
CaYb_{4}Al_{2}Sb_{5.5}Ge_{0.5}	orthorhombic	P1m1	a=13.9770 b=4.4203 c=11.9985	741.30			
CaYb_{4}Al_{2}Sb_{5.3}Ge_{0.7}	orthorhombic						
HfGe_{0.205}Sb_{1.795}	orthorhombic	Pnma	a=7.312 b=3.943 c=9.488 Z=4	273.5	10.002		
Hf_{3}Cu_{2}Ge_{3.58}Sb_{1.42}	tetragonal	P4/nmm	a = 3.8023 c = 24.575 Z=2	355.3	10.241		
