= Arsenidosilicate =

Arsenidosilicates are chemical compounds that contain anions with arsenic bonded to silicon. They are in the category of tetrelarsenides, pnictidosilicates, or tetrelpnictides. They can be classed as Zintl phases or intermetallics. They are analogous to the nitridosilicates, phosphidosilicates, arsenidogermanates, and arsenidostannates. They are distinct from arsenate silicates which have oxygen connected with arsenic and silicon, or arsenatosilicates with arsenate groups sharing oxygen with silicate.

Arsenidosilicates have dark coloured crystals, usually metallic black. They are often decomposed by water, and some are unstable with respect to the water in air.

These compounds have been investigated as ionic conductors, semiconductors and photovoltaics.

== List ==
name	formula	formula weight	crystal system	space group	unit cell	volume	density	comments	ref
	Li_{2}SiAs_{2}		tetragonal	I4_{1}/acd	a=12.563 c=19.390			red; air sensitive; Si_{4}As_{10} units	
	LiSi_{3}As_{6}		orthorhombic	Cmca	a=14.244 b=11.247 c=10.757			water and acid stable	
	Li_{5}SiAs_{3}		monoclinic	C2/c				black, hydrolysed by water	
	Li_{3}Si_{7}As_{8}		monoclinic	P2/m	a=8.9904 b=3.7154 c=11.6023 β=96.307 Z=1	385.21	3.52	layered; moisture sensitive	
	NaSi_{3}As_{3}		orthorhombic		a=10.002 b=18.54 c=3.648				
	Li_{1.5}Ga_{0.9}Si_{3.1}As_{4}		monoclinic	C2/c	Z = 8 a = 10.8838 b = 10.8821 c = 13.1591 β=101.959	1535.5	3.979	dark grey	
	Na_{1.36}(Si_{0.86}Ga_{0.14})_{2}As_{2.98}		tetragonal	I4_{1}/a	Z = 100? a = 19.8772 c = 37.652	14914.9	3.592	dark grey	
	MgSiAs_{2}	202.24	tetragonal	I4̅2d	a=5.9078 c=10.600 Z=4	369.96	3.63		
	Mg_{3}Si_{6}As_{8}	840.33	cubic	P4_{3}32	a=11.600 Z=4	1560.9	3.58	red	
	K_{2}SiAs_{2}		orthorhombic	Ibam	a=13.132 b=6.999 c=6.340 Z=4			golden; explosive decomposition; air sensitive; CAS No=108945-44-4	
	KSi_{3}As_{3}		orthorhombic	Pbam	a=10.010b=19.139 c=3.664 Z=4			purple; 2D framework	
	ZnSiAs_{2}							melt 1096°C; p-type semiconductor	
	Sr_{3}Si_{2}As_{4}							metallic red; chains	
	CdSiAs_{2}		tetragonal	I4̅2d	a = 5.884 c = 10.882 Z=8				
	Cd_{7}SiAs_{6}	1264.41	cubic	P2_{1}3	a=10.9820 Z=4	1324.5	6.343	black	
	Cs_{0.16}SiAs_{2}							water stable	
	Cs_{2}SiAs_{2}		orthorhombic	Ibam	a=7.571 b=14.425 c=6.42			water sensitive	
	Cs_{5}SiAs_{3}		orthorhombic	Pnma	a=14.467 b=6.043 c=15.82			dark red metallic; air sensitive; planar	
	Cs_{0.11}Zn_{0.05}Si_{0.95}As	119.39	monoclinic	C2/m	a=35.201 b=3.6649 c=9.9848 β=91.863° Z=24	1287.4	3.70	black	
	ZrCuSiAs		tetragonal	P4/nmm	a=3.6736 c=9.5712 Z=2				
	Ba_{4}SiAs_{4}							dark metallic; unstable in air	
	BaCuSi_{2}As_{3}		orthorhombic	Pnma	a=13.169 b=10.502 c=4.615			thermal insulate, electrical conductor	
	BaGa_{2}Si_{7}As_{12}							SHG 2.6 × ZGP; birefringence 0.077	
	BaIn_{2}Si_{7}As_{12}							SHG 3.7 × ZGP; birefringence 0.096	
	Ba_{13}Si_{6}Sn_{8}As_{22}	4551.72	tetragonal	I4̅2m	a = 14.4857, c = 13.5506 Z=2	2843.4	5.316	black; Si_{4}As_{10} units; band gap 1.0 eV	
	LaSiAs_{3}		orthorhombic	Pbca	a=6.0855 b=5.9837 c=26.2279 Z=8				
	LaSiAs_{3}		orthorhombic	Pn2_{1}a	a=6.0498 b=5.9545 c=26.383 Z=8				
	CeSiAs_{3}		orthorhombic	Pn2_{1}a	a=5.998 b=5.906 c=26.231 Z=8				
	PrSiAs_{3}		orthorhombic	Pn2_{1}a	a = 5.949, b = 5.877, c = 26.149 Z=8				
	HfCuSiAs		tetragonal	P4/nmm	a=3.634 c=9.601	126.8			
	TaSiAs		tetragonal	P4/nmm					
	IrSi_{3}As_{3}		monoclinic	Cm	a=6.8476 b=7.47633 c=5.69156 β=118.4270° Z=2	256.24	6.496	dark brownish-grey; non-linear optic 1.7× AGS; decompose 1060 °C; band gap 1.5 eV	
	AuSiAs		monoclinic	Cc	a=7.2000 b=6.1614 c=6.1646, β =119.135°				
