= Oxonitridosilicate =

Class of chemical compounds

The oxonitridosilicates, also called sions (Si + O + N) or silicon-oxynitrides are inorganic ceramic compounds in which oxygen and nitrogen atoms are bound to a silicon atom. A common variant also has aluminium replacing some silicon. They can be considered as silicates in which nitrogen partially replaces oxygen, or as nitridosilicates with oxygen partly replacing nitrogen.

== Formation ==
A possible way to make these compounds is to heat metal oxides or carbonates with silicon nitride and silica in a nitrogen atmosphere.

== Properties ==
Oxonitridosilicates have diverse structures. At the small scale silicon forms tetrahedral shapes surrounded by four oxygen or nitrogen atoms. With oxygen, one point of a tetrahedron can be bridged to another denoted O^{[2]}, or the oxygen can be a terminal atom denoted O^{[1]}. With nitrogen, it can be shared in more ways: terminal N^{[1]}, bridged between two tetrahedra N^{[2]}, or even three or four: N^{[3]}, N^{[4]}. With nitrogen, tetrahedra can be fused on an edge, or a point, whereas oxygen only connects tetrahedra at a vertex.

The condensation ratio, denoted by K indicates how condensed the tetrahedra are. K is the number of silicon atoms divided by the sum of oxygen and nitrogen. For SiN_{4}^{8−} or SIO_{2}^{4+} K is 1/4 and it increases to 1/2 for SiO_{_{2}}.

== Use ==
Oxonitridosilicates doped with europium have been used as phosphors in white LEDs, as they convert some blue light to other colours that can mix to white.

== Listing ==
name	formula	crystal system	space group	unit cell	volume	phosphor colour Eu^{2+}	comments	ref
	LiSiNO							
	Li_{3}SiNO_{2}							
	Li_{6}SiN_{2}O_{2}							
	Li_{7}SiN_{3}O		Fm3m	a=4.6994				
	Li_{5}SiNO_{3}							
	Na_{3}SiNO_{2}							
	CaSi_{2}O_{2}N_{2}							
	Ca_{2.89}Si_{2}N_{1.76}O_{4.24} Ca_{3}Si_{2}O_{4}N_{2}	cubic	Pa3̅	a = 15.0626 Å V = 3417.45 Å^{3} Z=24		green	colourless	
	SrSi_{2}O_{2}N_{2}					green		
	Li_{4}Sr_{4}[Si_{4}O_{4}N_{6}]O	tetragonal	P4_{2}/nmc	a=7.4833, c = 9.8365 V=552.81 Z = 2		orange	band gap 3.6 eV	
	Sr_{3}Si_{13}Al_{3}O_{2}N_{21}	orthorhombic		a = 9.037, b = 14.734, c = 7.464		green		
	Y_{4}SiO_{7}N_{2}							
	BaSi_{2}O_{2}N_{2}					bluish green		
	Ba_{3}Si_{6}O_{9}N_{4}					bluish green		
	Ba_{3}Si_{6}O_{12}N_{2}	trigonal	P3	a = 7.5046 c = 6.4703		green		
	La_{5}Si_{3}O_{12}N	hexagonal	P6_{3}/m	a=9.7051 c=7.2546 Z=1	591.76		white UV>261	
	La_{4}SiO_{7}N_{2}	monoclinic	P12_{1}/C1	a=8.036 b=10.992 c=11.109 β=110.92 Z=4	916.75		white UV>283	
	LaSiO_{2}N	hexagonal	P6c2	a=7.310 c=9.550 V=441.95 Z=6			white UV>263	
	La_{3}Si_{8}O_{4}N_{11}	orthorhombic	C2/c	a=15.850 b=4.9029 c=18.039 Z=4	1271.05		white UV>243	
	La_{3}[SiON_{3}]O	tetragonal	I4/mcm	a = 6.822, c = 11.074 Å, Z = 4				
	La_{16}[Si_{8}N_{22}][SiON_{3}]_{2}	triclinic	P1̅	a = 5.718, b = 11.391, c = 13.435, α = 112.02, β = 90.19, γ = 90.58 Z=2	811.1			
	Ce_{4}[Si_{4}O_{4}N_{6}]O						green-yellow	
	Ce_{3}[SiON_{3}]O	tetragonal	I4/mcm	a = 6.723, c = 11.069 Å, Z = 4			dark red	
	Sr_{3}Ce_{10}Si_{18}Al_{12}O_{18}N_{36}							
	Pr_{3}[SiON_{3}]O	tetragonal	I4/mcm	a = 6.6979, c = 11.005 Å, Z = 4				
	Pr_{4}Si_{2}O_{7}N_{2}							
	Gd_{3}[SiON_{3}]O	tetragonal	I4/mcm					
	Sr_{3}Pr_{10}Si_{18}Al_{12}O_{18}N_{36}							
	Sr_{3}Nd_{10}Si_{18}Al_{12}O_{18}N_{36}							
	Sr_{10}Sm_{6}Si_{30}Al_{6}O_{7}N_{54}							
	EuSi_{2}O_{2}N_{2}	triclinic	P1	a=7.095 b=7.246 c=7.256 α=88.69 β=84.77 γ=75.84 Z=4				
ytterbium silicon oxynitride	Yb_{4}Si_{2}O_{7}N_{2}							
