= Nitridogermanate =

The nitridogermanates are chemical compounds containing germanium atoms bound to nitrogen. The simplest anion is GeN_{4}^{8−}, but these are often condensed, with the elimination of nitrogen.

Nitridogermanates can form quite a few structures. Germanium can be in three different oxidation states. In the +2 oxidation state there is [Ge^{II}N_{2}]^{4−} which has a boomerang shape. The most common is the +4 state with [Ge^{IV}N_{3}]^{5−} is a planar three pointed star, and [Ge^{IV}N_{4}]^{8−} as tetrahedra. Condensation of the tetrahedra yields [Ge_{2} ^{IV}N_{6}]^{10−}. The +3 state is rare, and represented by [Ge^{III} _{2}N_{6}]^{12−} with a covalent bond between the two germanium atoms. A few compounds also contain germanium in negative oxidation states −2 and −4 and so can be considered germanides as well.

== Synthesis ==
Reduced compounds may be produced by using a flux of molten sodium. Nitrogen may be introduced by using sodium azide. Alkaline earth elements increase the solubility of nitrogen in molten sodium. Containers can be made from sealed tubes of niobium or tantalum. The sodium can be evaporated by heating to over 300 °C in a vacuum.

== Properties ==
Nitridogermanates tend to be unstable in air, as they react with water vapour to form ammonia.

== Related ==
Nitridogermanates are in the category of nitridotetralates, or more generally nitridometallates, tetrel pnictides or pnictidometallates. Related compounds include the nitridosilicates, and rare nitridostannates. By varying the pnictogen, there are also the phosphidogermanates. Other similar compounds are the nitridogallates and nitridomanganates.

Subtypes may be termed nitridoalumogermanates or nitridomagnesogermanates, if they contain aluminium or magnesium.

== List ==
| name | formula | formula weight | crystal system | space group | unit cell Å | volume | density | comments | ref |
|---|---|---|---|---|---|---|---|---|---|
| | α-Ge_{3}N_{4} | | | | | | | | |
| phenacite phase of germanium nitride | β-Ge_{3}N_{4} | | | | | | | | |
| spinel germanium nitride | γ-Ge_{3}N_{4} | | | Fd3̅m | a 8.2125Å b 8.2125Å c 8.2125 | | | | |
| | Ca_{2}GeN_{2} | | tetragonal | P4_{2}/mbc | a = 11.2004, c = 5.0482, Z = 8 | | | black | |
| | Ca_{4}GeN_{4} | | monoclinic | P2_{1}/c | a = 9.2823, b = 6.0429, c = 11.1612, β = 116.498°, Z = 4 | | | orange | |
| pentacalcium nitridodigermanate | Ca_{5}[Ge_{2}N_{6}] | | | C2/c | a 9.836 b 6.0519 c 12.757 β 100.2° | | | colourless | |
| | Ca_{6}[Ge_{2}N_{6}] | | trigonal | R3̅ | a=9.2078 c=9.2679 | 680.5 | 3.439 | grey; band gap 1.1 eV | |
| | Ca_{7}[GeN_{6}] | | orthorhombic | Pbcn | a = 10.826, b = 6.194, c = 13.121 Z=4 | 879.8 | 3.301 | yellow with N^{3−} | |
| | Ca_{0.8}Li_{0.2}Al_{0.8}Ge_{1.2}N_{3} | | | | a = 9.9822, b = 5.7763, c = 5.1484, Z = 4 | | | | |
| | Li_{4}Ca_{13}Ge_{6}N_{18} | | monoclinic | C2/c | a = 12.328 b = 12.662 c = 14.711 β = 108.688° | 2175.2 | 3.776 | clear | |
| | Mg_{5}Ca_{2}GeN_{6} | | | P6_{3}/mmc | a = 3.453, c = 17.51 | 180.8 | | | |
| | Mg_{5}Ca_{4}Ge_{3}N_{10} | | monoclinic | C2/m | a = 11.269, b = 3.327, c = 8.008, β = 109.80° Z=4 | 282.4 | | colourless; layered | |
| | ZnGeN_{2} | | | | | | | | |
| strontium gallium germanium subnitirde | Sr_{2}GeGaN | | monoclinic | P2_{1}/c | a=6.885 b=4.0432 c=8.680 β =108.454 Z=2 | 229.21 | 4.804 | black glossy | |
| | Li_{3}Ca_{4}(Ga_{3}Ge)N_{8} | | | | | | | | |
| | α-Sr_{2}[GeN_{2}] | 275.85 | tetragonal | P4_{2}/mbc | a=11.773 c=5.409 Z=8 | 749.7 | | black | |
| | β-Sr_{2}[GeN_{2}] | 275.85 | orthorhombic | Cmac | a=5.441 b=11.377 c=12.229 Z=8 | 756.9 | 4.841 | black with blue sheen | |
| | Sr_{3}Ge_{2}N_{2} | 436.1 | monoclinic | P2_{1}/m | a = 9.032, b = 3.883, c = 9.648, β = 112.42°, Z=2 | 312.9 | 4.630 | dark blue-grey | |
| | Sr_{4}[GeN_{4}] | | monoclinic | P2_{1}/c | a = 9.7923, b = 6.3990, c = 11.6924 β = 115.966° | | | dark red | |
| | Sr_{5}[Ge_{2}N_{6}] | 667.36 | monoclinic | C2/c | a = 10.408, b = 6.521, c = 13.565, β = 100.29° Z = 4 | 905.8 | 4.893 | yellow/ orange | |
| | Sr_{7}[GeN_{6}] | | orthorhombic | Pbcn | a = 11.526, b = 6.587, c = 13.836 Z=4 | 1050.5 | 4.869 | red with N^{3−}; Sr in 4-fold coordination | |
| | Sr_{6}[Ge_{2}N_{6}] | | trigonal | R3̅ | a=9.6655 c=9.6655 | 790.91 | 4.755 | black; band gap 0.2 eV | |
| | Sr_{8}Ge_{2}[GeN_{4}] | | monoclinic | Cc | a = 10.1117, b = 17.1073, c = 10.0473, β = 115.966° | | | black | |
| pentastrontium nitridodigermanate | Sr_{6}Ge_{5}N_{2} | 916.69 | orthorhombic | Pmmn | a = 4.0007, b = 17.954, c = 9.089 Z=2 | 652.8 | 4.663 | black; unstable in air | |
| Strontium Germanium Nitride | Sr_{11}Ge_{4}N_{6} | 1338.24 | tetragonal | P4nbm | a=7.278 c=18.681 Z=2 | 989.5 | 4.491 | black; contains Ge^{4−} | |
| | Sr_{17}Ge_{6}N_{14} | | triclinic | P1̅ | a = 7.5392, b = 9.7502, c = 11.6761, α = 103.308°, β = 94.651°, γ = 110.248° | | | black; contains Ge^{4−} | |
| | Li_{4}Sr_{3}Ge_{2}N_{6} | | monoclinic | C2/m | a=6.1398, b=10.021, c=6.3130, β=91.279°, Z=2 | | | | |
| | Mg_{3}SrGeN_{4} | | tetragonal | I4/m | a = 8.316, c = 3.398, Z = 2 | | | | |
| | MgSr_{3}GeN_{4} | | orthorhombic | Pnna | a=5.939, b=10.320, c=9.618, Z=6 | | | yellow | |
| | Ba_{3}Ge_{2}N_{2} | | monoclinic | P2_{1}/m | a = 9.61196, b = 4.0466, c = 10.1337 β = 113.55° Z=2 | 361.61 | 5.375 | metallic; contains Ge^{2−} | |
| | Ba_{6}Ge_{5}N_{2} | 1215.01 | orthorhombic | Pmmn | a = 4.1620, b = 18.841, c = 9.6116 Z=2 | 753.7 | 5.354 | black; unstable in air | |
| | Ba_{9}Ge_{3}N_{10} | | rhombohedral | R3̅c | a=7.9399 c=17.282 Z=2 | 943.53 | 5.610 | black | |
| | MgBa_{3}GeN_{4} | | orthorhombic | Pnma | a=6.159 b=10.558 c=10.048 Z=4 | 653.4 | 5.743 | yellow | |
| | Mg_{3}BaGeN_{4} | | tetragonal | I4/m | a = 8.392, c = 3.4813, Z = 2 | | | | |
| barium gallium germanium subnitirde | Ba_{2}GeGaN | | monoclinic | P2_{1}/c | a 7.249 b 4.21 c 9.314 β 108.87° | | | black glossy | |
