= Nitridosilicate =

Class of chemical compounds

The nitridosilicates are chemical compounds that have anions with nitrogen bound to silicon. Counter cations that balance the electric charge are mostly electropositive metals from the alkali metals, alkaline earths or rare earth elements. Silicon and nitrogen have similar electronegativities, so the bond between them is covalent. Nitrogen atoms are arranged around a silicon atom in a tetrahedral arrangement.

Related compounds include pnictogenidosilicates :phosphidosilicates, arsenidosilicates and antimonosilicates; pnictogenidogernamates: phosphidogermanates. By replacing silicon, there are also nitridogermanates, nitridostannates, nitridotantalates and nitridotitanates.

== Use ==
Nitridosilicates are used as host substances for europium in LED phosphors. Examples include CASN (calcium aluminium silicide nitride) (CaAlSiN_{3}), SCASN (SrCaAlSiN_{3}) and SCSN (SrCaSiN_{3}). These fluoresce red.

== Production ==
Nitridosilicates can be made in a solid state reaction by heating silicon nitride with metallic nitrides in a nitrogen atmosphere at over 1300 °C. If the mixtures are exposed to oxygen or air, then oxides or oxynitridosilicates are produced instead. Instead of metal nitrides, ammine complexes, amides or imides can be used instead. In place of the highly stable silicon nitride, silicon diimide can be used. Carbothermal reduction involves using a metal oxide or carbonate heated with carbon in a nitrogen atmosphere.

== Properties ==
The ratio of silicon to nitrogen varies from 1:4 to 7:10 (0.25 to 0.7) with increased condensation, and fewer sites for metals with high silicon content. At a ratio of 3:4 (0.75) there is no longer capacity for metal, as that is silicon nitride. The more condensed substances, with lower nitrogen content, have greater number of silicon atoms surrounding the nitrogen. This coordination number can vary from one to four, with the most common being three. The silicon atom always is coordinated by four nitrogen atoms. In the silicates, silicon is surrounded by four oxygen atoms, but each oxygen is only connected to one or two silicon atoms, and only very rarely three. So nitridosilicates can form more diverse structures than the silicates.

Nitridosilicates with higher proportion of silicon (more condensed) are more resistant to attack by water and oxygen, and so can be exposed to the atmosphere without decomposition. These condensed nitridosilicates are mechanically strong, and resistant to heat, acids and alkalis.

SiN_{4} tetrahedra can be connected to each other via vertices or edges. This differs from SiO_{4} which only connects via vertices.

== Use ==
Nitridosilicates have been used to make abrasives, turbine blades, cutting tools and phosphors.

== Nitridosilicates ==
name	formula	formula weight	crystal system	space group	unit cell	volume	density	comments	ref
	LiSi_{2}N_{3}								
	Li_{2}SiN_{2}								
	Li_{5}SiN_{3}								
	Li_{8}SiN_{4}								
	Li_{18}Si_{3}N_{10}								
	Li_{21}Si_{3}N_{11}			I4	a=9.4584 c=9.5194			antifluorite structure	
	BeSiN_{2}								
	MgSiN_{2}								
	NaSi_{2}N_{3}								
	Ca_{2}Si_{5}N_{8}	332.64	monoclinic	Cc	a = 14.3280 b = 5.61165 c = 9.69406 β = 112.1484 Z=4	721.92	3.06	Eu orange fluorescence	
	CaSiN_{2}								
	Ca_{3}SiN_{3}H		monoclinic	C2/c	a = 5.236 b = 10.461 c = 16.389 β = 91.182° Z = 8			semiconductor: band gap 3.1 eV	
	Ca_{4}SiN_{4}								
	Ca_{5}Si_{2}N_{6}								
	Ca_{12}Si_{4}[SiN_{4}]		triclinic	P1̅	a 9.0103 b 9.0218 c 13.8252 α 71.053° β 82.738° γ 69.763°			black	
	Ca_{16}Si_{17}N_{34}								
	CaMg_{3}SiN_{4}			I4_{1}/a					
	Ca_{5}[Si_{2}Al_{2}N_{8}]		orthorhombic	Pbcn	a = 9.255 b = 6.140 c = 15.578				
	LiCa_{3}Si2N_{5}		monoclinic	C2/c	a = 5.145 b = 20.380 c = 10.357 β = 91.24°				
	Li_{4}Ca_{3}Si_{2}N_{6}	288.24	monoclinic	C2/m	a=5.787 b=9.705 c=5.977 β=90.45	335.7	2.852		
	Li_{2}CaSi_{2}N_{4}								
	Li_{2}Ca_{2}Mg_{2}Si_{2}N_{6}								
	Li_{2}Ca_{3}MgSi_{2}N_{6}								
	CaMg_{3}SiN_{4}			I4_{1}/a	a = 11.424 c = 13.445 Z=16				
	CaAlSiN_{3}		orthorhombic	Cmc2_{1}				Eu yellow fluorescence	
	CaAlSi_{4}N_{7}		orthorhombic	Pna2_{1}	a = 11.6819, b = 21.0193, c = 4.9177 Å				
	Ca_{4}AlSiN_{5}		orthorhombic	Pna2_{1}	a 11.2058 b 9.0512 c 6.0203			faint red	
	Ca_{5}Al_{2}Si_{2}N_{8}		orthorhombic	Pbca	a= 9.255 b = 6.140 c = 15.578 Z=4	885.2	3.171	yellow	
	CaScSi_{4}N_{7}								
Manganese silicide dinitride	MnSiN_{2}		orthorhombic	Pna2_{1}	a = 5.271, b = 6.521, and c = 5.0706 V=174.26			intense red	
	Fe_{2}Si_{5}N_{8}	364.23	monoclinic	Cc	a= 14.0408 b = 5.32635 c = 9.5913 β = 110.728 Z=4			decompose 1370K; brown	
	ZnSiN_{2}								
	SrSiN_{2}								
	Sr_{2}Si_{5}N_{8}		orthorhombic	Pmn2_{1}	a = 5.71006 b = 6.81914 c = 9.33599 Z=2	363.52	3.908	Eu red fluorescence	
	SrSi_{6}N_{8}								
	SrSi_{7}N_{10}								
	Sr_{5}Si_{7}P_{2}N_{16}	920.83		Pnma	a=5.6748 b=28.0367 c=9.5280 Z=4	1522.1	4.018		
	SrAlSi_{4}N_{7}		orthorhombic	Pna2_{1}	a = 11.742 b = 21.391 c = 4.966 Z = 8	1247.2			
	Li_{2}SrSi_{2}N_{4}		cubic		a=10.69 Z=12	1220			
	Li_{4}Sr_{3}Si_{2}N_{6}		monoclinic	C2/m	a = 6.127, b = 9.687, c = 6.220, β = 90.24° Z=2	369.1	3.876		
	SrBeSi_{2}N_{4}			p6̅2c	a=4.86082 c=9.42264 Z=2				
	SrMg_{3}SiN_{4}			I4_{1}/a	a = 11.495 c = 13.512 Z=16				
	Sr_{8}Mg_{7}Si_{9}N_{22}			Cm	a 15.280 b 7.4691 c 10.936 β 110.462°				
	SrAlSiN_{3}			Cmc2_{1}					
	SrAlSi_{4}N_{7}			Pna2_{1}					
	SrScSi_{4}N_{7}								
	YScSi_{4}N_{6}C		hexagonal	P6_{3}mc	a=5.9109 c=9.677				
	CaYSi_{4}N_{7}								
	SrYSi_{4}N_{7}								
	Ca_{8}In_{2}SiN_{4}		orthorhombic	Ibam	a = 12.904 b = 9.688 c = 10.899 Z = 4			metallic	
	BaSiN_{2}								
	Ba_{5}Si_{2}N_{6}								
	Ba_{2}Si_{5}N_{8}		orthorhombic	Pmn2_{1}				Eu red fluorescence	
	BaSi_{6}N_{8}			Imm2	a = 7.9316, b = 9.3437, c = 4.8357, Z = 2	358.38			
	BaSi_{7}N_{10}		monoclinic		a = 6.8729, b = 6.7129, c = 9.6328, β = 106.269, Z = 2			most condensed	
	Ba_{6}Si_{6}N_{10}O_{2}(CN_{2})			P6̅	a = 16.255, c = 5.469, Z = 3			yellow, grown in liquid sodium	
	BaMg_{3}SiN_{4}			P1̅	a = 3.451 b = 6.069 c = 6.101 α = 85.200 β = 73.697 γ = 73.566° Z=1				
	Ba_{2}AlSi_{5}N_{9}		triclinic	P1	a = 9.860 b = 10.320 c = 10.346 α = 90.37° β = 118.43° γ = 103.69° Z = 4				
	Ba_{5}Si_{11}Al_{7}N_{25}			Pnnm	a = 9.5923, b = 21.3991, c = 5.8889 Å Z = 2			with Eu yellow emission	
	BaSi_{4}Al_{3}N_{9}			P2_{1}/C	a = 5.8465, b = 26.726, c = 5.8386 Å, β = 118.897° and Z = 4			with Eu blue emission	
	BaScSi_{4}N_{7}								
	BaYSi_{4}N_{7}								
	LaSi_{3}N_{5}		orthorhombic	P2_{1}2_{1}2_{1}	a=7.853 b=11.264 c=4.8172				
	La_{3}Si_{6}N_{11}		tetragonal	P4bm					
	La_{5}Si_{3}N_{9}								
	La_{7}Si_{6}N_{15}								
	Li_{5}La_{5}Si_{4}N_{12}		tetragonal	P4̅b2	a = 11.043 c = 5.573 Z = 2				
calcium lanthanum nitridosilicate	CaLaSiN_{3}							Ca can be substituted by Yb or Eu	
	CaLaSi_{4}N_{7}								
	CeSi_{3}N_{5}		orthorhombic	P2_{1}2_{1}2_{1}					
	Ce_{3}Si_{6}N_{11}		tetragonal	P4bm					
	Ce_{3}Si_{5}N_{9}								
	Ce_{7}Si_{6}N_{15}		triclinic						
	Ce_{7}Si_{6}N_{15}		trigonal						
	Li_{5}Ce_{5}Si_{4}N_{12}		tetragonal	P4̅b2	a = 10.978 c = 5.514 Z = 2				
	PrSi_{3}N_{5}		orthorhombic	P2_{1}2_{1}2_{1}					
	Pr_{3}Si_{6}N_{11}		tetragonal	P4bm					
	Pr_{5}Si_{3}N_{9}								
	Pr_{7}Si_{6}N_{15}								
	NdSi_{3}N_{5}		orthorhombic	P2_{1}2_{1}2_{1}					
	Nd_{3}Si_{6}N_{11}		tetragonal	P4bm					
	Ba_{2}Nd_{7}Si_{11}N_{23}							dark blue	
	Sm_{3}Si_{6}M_{11}		tetragonal	P4bm	a=9.997 c=4.836				
	Ca_{3}Sm_{3}[Si_{9}N_{17}]		cubic	P4_3m	a=7.3950; Z=1	404.4			
	Eu_{2}SiN_{3}			Cmca	a = 5.42, b = 10.610, c = 11.629, Z = 8				
dieuropium penta siliconoctanitride	Eu_{2}Si_{5}N_{8}		orthorhombic	Pnm2_{1}	a=5.7094 b=6.8207 c=9.3291 Z=2	363.29	5.087	red	
	EuMg_{3}SiN_{4}			I4_{1}/a	a = 11.511 c = 13.552 Z=16				
	Ca_{3}Yb_{3}[Si_{9}N_{17}]		cubic	P4_3m	a=730.20 Z=1	389.3			
	BaYbSi_{4}N_{7}							includes NSi_{4} clusters	
europium ytterbium tetrasiliconheptanitride	EuYbSi_{4}N_{7}		hexagonal	P6_{3}mc	a=5.9822 c=9.7455	302.03	5.887	brown	
	SrYbSi_{4}N_{7}								
	EuYbSi_{4}N_{7}								
	CaLuSi_{4}N_{7}								
	SrLuSi_{4}N_{7}								
	BaLuSi_{4}N_{7}								
	Pb_{2}Si_{5}N_{8}	666.90	orthorhombic	Pmn2_{1}	a = 5.774 b = 6.837 c = 9.350	269.11	6.001	Pb-Pb dumbbells	
