= Phosphidogermanate =

Phosphidogermanates are chemical compounds that have phosphorus bound to germanium to yield anions. They are in the category of phosphidotetrelates and also pnictides. They are analogous to nitridogermanates, phosphidoaluminates, phosphidogallates, phosphidoindates, phosphidosilicates or phosphidostannates.

They are under investigation as infrared non-linear optic materials and solid-state electrolytes.

== List ==
formula	MW	crystal system	space group	unit cell Å	volume	density	form	properties	references
GeP		monoclinic	C2/m	a = 15.1948 b = 3.6337 c = 9.1941 β = 101.239°					
Li_{2}GeP_{2}	148.458	tetragonal	I4_{1}/acd	a = 12.3069 c = 19.0306 Z=32	2882.42	2.736	Ge_{4}P_{10} supratetrahedra	red	
LiGe_{3}P_{3}	317.751	orthorhombic	Pbam	a = 9.8459 b = 15.7489 c = 3.5995 Z=4	558.15	3.780	GeP_{4} and Ge(P_{3}Ge) tetrahedra in 5 and 6-membered rings making 2D slabs	black	
Li_{8}GeP_{4}	252		Pa3̅	a=11.80203 c=11.80203 Z=8	1643.88	2.037			
Li_{8}GeP_{4}	251.99	cubic	P4̅3n	a=11.77294 Z=8	1635.98	2.046			
Li_{14}GeP_{6}		cubic	Fm3̅m	a=5.95667 Z=4		1.860		brown	
Li_{10.1}Ge_{5}P			Pnma	a=10.360 b=4.3072 c=24.267 Z=4	1082.8	2.86	Ge_{5} rings	black; actually is a germanide phosphide	
NaGe_{3}P_{3}		orthorhombic	Pmc2_{1}	a=3.6276 b=8.407 c=10.332 Z=2	315.09	3.517	Ge_{3}P_{7} ring	red; band gap 2.06 eV; semiconductor	
Na_{2}Ge_{3}P_{3}	356.72	monoclinic	C2/m	a = 17.639 b = 3.6176 c = 11.354 β = 92.74° Z=4	723.7	3.274		black	
Na_{3}Ge_{2}P_{3}	307.06	monoclinic	P2_{1}/c	a = 7.2894 b = 14.7725 c = 7.0528 β = 106.331° Z=4	728.8	2.798	Ge_{2}P_{6} with shared P	black	
Na_{5}Ge_{7}P_{5}		monoclinic	C2/m	a = 16.168 b = 3.6776 c = 12.924 β = 91.30° Z=2	768.2	3.343		black	
Na_{8}GeP_{4}	380.4	cubic	Fd3̅m	a=13.4230 Z=8	2418.53	2.08943	same as Na_{8}SnSb_{4}	black; decomposes over 350 °C to Na_{10}Ge_{2}P_{6};band gap 1.9 eV	
Na_{10}Ge_{2}P_{6}		monoclinic	P2_{1}/n	a=13.176 b =7.36.4 c=8.042 β=90.26° Z=2	780.29	2.38		beige; moisture sensitive	
CuGe_{2}P_{3}									
ZnGeP_{2}			I4̅2d	a=5.466 c=10.722				melt 1027 °C	
Ag_{6}Ge_{10}P_{12}	1744.76	cubic	I4̅3m	a=10.3111 Z=2	1096.3	5.286		air stable; silver grey; thermoelectric	
CdGeP_{2}			I4̅2d	a=5.740 c=10.773					
Cs_{5}GeP_{3}		orthorhombic	Pnma	a=14.31 b=5.994 c=15.618 Z=4				metallic	
BaGe_{2}P_{2}	344.46	tetragonal	P4_{2}mc	a =7.6153 c =8.490 Z=4	492.3	4.647		light metallic grey; melt 861 °C	
BaGe_{7}P_{12}			R3̅	a=12.6309 c =9.2472 Z=3	1277.7	3.967	Ge_{2}P_{6} P-P		
