= Arsenidogermanate =

Arsenidogermanates are chemical compounds that contain anions with arsenic bonded to germanium. They are in the category of tetrelarsenides, pnictidogermanates, or tetrelpnictides.

Germanium forms two arsenides: GeAs and GeAs_{2}.

== List ==
| name | formula | formula weight | crystal system | space group | unit cell | volume | density | comments | ref |
|---|---|---|---|---|---|---|---|---|---|
| | LiGe_{3}As_{3} | | orthorhombic | Pbam | a=10.0862 b=15.7612 c=3.7403 Z=4 | 594.60 | 5.01 | | |
| | Li_{5}GeAs_{3} | | | | | | | black | |
| | NaGe_{6}As_{6} | 908.05 | monoclinic | C2/m | a = 22.063, b = 3.8032, c = 7.2020, β = 92.744°, Z = 2 | 603.64 | 5.00 | needles | |
| | Na_{10}Ge_{2}As_{6} | | monoclinic | P12_{1}/n1 | a=13.531 b=7.544 c=8.298 β = 90.2° Z=2 | 847.0 | | | |
| | K_{2}GeAs_{2} | | orthorhombic | Ibam | a = 13.292, b = 7.028, c = 6.548 Z = 4 | | | moisture sensitive needles | |
| | KGe_{3}As_{3} | 481.53 | orthorhombic | Pnma | a=9.993, b=3.7664, c=18.607 Z=4 | 700.34 | 4.568 | | |
| | K_{2}Ge_{3}As_{3} | 520.73 | orthorhombic | Pnnm | a=14.1466 b=16.300 c=3.7489 Z=4 | 864.47 | 4.001 | fibrous metallic | |
| | K_{2}NaGaAs_{2} | | | Ibam | a=6.733 b=14.809 c=6.574 Z=4 | 655.5 | 3.250 | | |
| | KCdGeAs_{2} | | triclinic | P1̅ | a = 8.004, b = 8.402, c = 8.703, α = 71.019°, β = 75.257°, γ = 73.746°, Z=4 | | | band gap 0.8 eV; Ge_{2}As_{6} units | |
| | RbCdGeAs_{2} | | triclinic | P1̅ | a = 8.269, b = 8.452, c = 8.735, α = 71.163°, β = 75.601°, γ = 73.673°, Z=4 | | | Ge_{2}As_{6} units | |
| | Sr_{3}Ge_{2}As_{4} | | | | | | | red metallic; 1D As_{3}Ge-GeAs_{3} units | |
| | K_{5}In_{5}Ge_{5}As_{14} | | monoclinic | C2/m | a=40.00,b=3.925,c=10.299, β=99.97°, Z=8 | 1592 | 4.55 | air sensitive; layered | |
| | K_{8}In_{8}Ge_{5}As_{17} | | monoclinic | P2_{1}/c | a=18.394,b=19.087,c=25.360, β=105.71°, Z=4 | 8571 | 4.45 | air sensitive; layered | |
| | RbGe_{3}As_{3} | 528 | orthorhombic | Pnma | a=10.166 b=3.7595 c=19.028 Z=4 | 727.2 | 4.823 | | |
| | Rb(Ge_{1.5}In_{0.5})As_{2}(As_{1.5}Ge_{0.5}) | | orthorhombic | Cmc2_{1} | a = 3.799, b = 16.50, c = 12.24, Z = 4 | 767 | 4.589 | | |
| | Rb_{X}Ge_{2−X}In_{X}As_{4} | | | | | | | | |
| | SrGe_{8}As_{10} | | orthorhombic | Cmca | a=14.5614 b=10.6452 c=11.4283 Z=4 | 1771.5 | 5.315 | | |
| | I_{8}As_{21}Ge_{25} | 4403 | cubic | Pm3̅n | a=10.5963 Z=1 | 1189.8 | 6.1431 | colourless | |
| | Cs_{5}GeAs_{3} | | | | | | | metallic; unstable in air; GeAs_{3} units | |
| | BaGe_{2}As_{2} | | tetragonal | P4_{2}mc | a=7,786 c=8.664 Z=4 | 525.2 | 5.47 | metallic | |
| | Ba_{4}GeAs_{4} | | | | | | | dark metallic; GeAs_{4} units | |
| | BaGe_{8}As_{10} | | orthorhombic | Cmca | a=14.5799 b=10.7164 c=11.5518 Z=4 | 1804.9 | 5.400 | | |
| | Re_{3}Ge_{0.6}As_{6.4} | | | | | | | | |
| | Re_{3}GeAs_{6} | 1080.75 | cubic | Im3̅m | a = 8.73202 Z=4 | 665.75 | 10.78 | n-type semiconductor | |
| | AuGeAs | | monoclinic | Cc | a 7.2729, b 6.2953, c 6.3067, β 119.209° | | | | |
| | K_{X}Ge_{2−X}Tl_{X}As_{4} | | | | | | | | |
