= Arsenidostannate =

Class of chemical compounds

Arsenidostanates are chemical compounds that contain anions with arsenic bonded to tin. They are in the category of tetrelarsenides, pnictidostannates, or tetrelpnictides.

They are distinct from arsenide stannides such as palarstanide, (Pd_{8}(Sn,As)_{3}) where the cation charge exceeds that on the tin or arsenic. Other minerals that contain arsenic and tin are erniggliite and coiraite.

== List ==
name	formula	formula weight	crystal system	space group	unit cell	volume	density	comments	ref
	Li_{1–x}Sn_{2+x}As_{2}, 0.2 < x < 0.4		trigonal	R3̅m	a=3.991-4.0244 c=25.592-25.632 Z=3	353.6-358.9			
	Na_{2}SnAs_{2}			I4_{1}/acd	a=14.166, c=21.191, Z = 32			metallic grey	
	NaSn_{2}As_{2}		rhombohedral	R3̅m	a=4.000 c=27.562			metallic; layers	
	KSn_{3}As_{3}		orthorhombic	Pnma	Z=4			band gap 0.50 eV	
	RbSn_{3}As_{3}		orthorhombic	Pnma	a=10.321, b=4.0917, c=19.570				
	Ca_{5}Sn_{2}As_{6}		orthorhombic	Pbam	a = 13.643, b = 11.830, c = 4.121 Z=2				
	α-Sr_{3}Sn_{2}As_{4}		orthorhombic	Cmca	a = 25.798, b = 12.888, c = 19.124, Z = 24	6358.8		melt 1185K; band gap 0.9 eV	
	β-Sr_{3}Sn_{2}As_{4}		monoclinic	P2_{1}/c	a = 7.705, b = 19.118, c = 7.688, β = 112.003°, Z = 4	1049.9		dec>800K; band gap 0.9 eV	
	Sr_{14}Sn_{3}As_{12}		trigonal	R3	Z=3				
	Ba_{3}Sn_{4}As_{6}		monoclinic	P2_{1}/n	a=8.637, b=18.354, c=9.721, β=90.05°, Z=4				
	BaCu_{6}Sn_{2}As_{4−x}		tetragonal	I4/mmm	a = 4.164, c = 24.088				
	Ba_{13}Si_{6}Sn_{8}As_{22}	4551.72	tetragonal	I4̅2m	a = 14.4857, c = 13.5506 Z=2	2843.4	5.316	black; Si_{4}As_{10} units; band gap 1.0 eV	
	EuSn_{2}As_{2}		trigonal						
	Eu_{14}Sn_{3}As_{12}		trigonal	R3	Z=3				
	Eu_{11}Zn_{4}Sn_{2}As_{12}	3069.46	monoclinic	C2/c	a = 7.5679, b = 13.0883, c = 31.305, β = 94.8444 Z=4	3089.7	6.599	silver; band gap 0.04 eV; ferromagnetic below 15K; negative colossal magnetoresistance	
