= Phosphidosilicates =

Class of chemical compounds

The phosphidosilicates or phosphosilicides are inorganic compounds containing silicon bonded to phosphorus and one or more other kinds of elements. In the phosphosilicates each silicon atom is surrounded by four phosphorus atoms in a tetrahedron. The triphosphosilicates have a SiP_{3} unit, that can be a planar triangle like carbonate CO_{3}. The phosphorus atoms can be shared to form different patterns e.g. [Si_{2}P_{6}]^{10−} which forms pairs, and [Si_{3}P_{7}]^{3−} which contains two-dimensional double layer sheets. [SiP_{4}]^{8−} with isolated tetrahedra, and [SiP_{2}]^{2−} with a three dimensional network with shared tetrahedron corners. SiP clusters can be joined, not only by sharing a P atom, but also by way of a P-P bond. This does not happen with nitridosilicates or plain silicates.

The phosphidosilicates can be considered as a subclass of the pnictogenidosilicates, where P can be substituted by N (nitridosilicates), As, or Sb. Also Silicon can be substituted to form other series of compounds by replacement with other +4 oxidation state atoms like germanium, tin, titanium or even tantalum.

== List ==
formula	name	crystal system	space group	unit cell Å	form	MW	density	properties	references
Li_{2}SiP_{2}		tetragonal	I4_{1}/acd	a=12.111 Å, c=18.658 Å, Z=32 V=2732.6	4 SiP_{4} tetrahedra are linked together to form a supertetrahedron. Supertetrahedrons are linked together by corner sharing.	103.91	2.02		
LiSi_{2}P_{3}			I4_{1}/a	a=18.4757 Å, c=35.0982 Å, Z=100	Interpenetrating networks of bridged supertetrahedra				
Li_{3}Si_{3}P_{7}		monoclinic	P2_{1}/m	a = 6.3356 Å, b = 7.2198 Å, c = 10.6176 Å, β = 102.941°, Z = 2				grey	
Li_{5}SiP_{3}		Cubic	Fm3̅m	a=5.84 Z=1.33	SiP_{4} tetrahedra, but some Si replace by Li				
Li_{10}Si_{2}P_{6}			P2_{1}/n	a = 7.2051 Å, b = 6.5808 Å, c = 11.6405 Å, β = 90.580°, Z = 4	contains Si_{2}P_{6} units with two Si atoms linked by two P atoms			also known by Li_{5}SiP_{3}	
Li_{8}SiP_{4}	lithium orthophosphidosilicate	cubic	Pa3	a=11.6784 Z=8 V=1592.76		207.49	1.73	orange red	
Li_{14}SiP_{6}		Cubic	Fm3̅m	a=5.9393 Z=4	SiP_{4} tetrahedra, but some Si replace by Li		1.644		
Na_{19}Si_{13}P_{25}		triclinic	P1̅	a =13.3550 Å, b =15.3909 Å, c =15.4609 Å, α =118.05°, β =111.71°, γ =93.05°, Z =2	T3 supertetrahedra			sodium ion conductor	
Na_{23}Si_{19}P_{33}		monoclinic	C2/c	a =28.4985 Å, b =16.3175 Å, c = 13.8732 Å, β =102.35°, Z =4	solely T3 supertetrahedra			sodium ion conductor	
Na_{23}Si_{28}P_{45}		monoclinic	P2_{1}/c	a =19.1630 Å, b =23.4038 Å, c = 19.0220 Å, β =104.30°, Z =4	T3 and T4 supertetrahedra			sodium ion conductor	
Na_{23}Si_{37}P_{57}		monoclinic	C2/c	a =34.1017 Å, b =16.5140 Å, c = 19.5764 Å, β =111.53°, Z =4	solely T4 supertetrahedra			sodium ion conductor	
LT-NaSi_{2}P_{3}		tetragonal	I4_{1}/a	a =19.5431 Å, c = 34.5317 Å, Z =100	fused T4 and T5 supertetrahedra			sodium ion conductor	
HT-NaSi_{2}P_{3}		tetragonal	I4_{1}/acd	a =20.8976 Å, c = 40.081 Å, Z =128	solely fused T5 supertetrahedra			sodium ion conductor	
Na_{2}SiP_{2}	disodium diphosphidosilicate	Tetrahedral	Pccn	a = 12.7929 Å, b = 22.3109 Å, c = 6.0522 Å and Z = 16	edge‐shared SiP_{4} tetrahedra with 1 width chains			dark red 0.43 eV	
Na_{5}SiP_{3}		monoclinic	P2_{1}/c	Z=4 a= 7.352 Å, b= 7.957, Å c= 13.164 Å, α=90.757°			2.06	also known by Na_{10}Si_{2}P_{6} band gap 1.292 eV	
Na_{3}K_{2}SiP_{3}	trisodium dipotassium triphosphidosilicate	Orthorhombic	Pnma	a=14.580 b=4.750 c= 13.020 V=901.7 Z=4	SiP_{3} triangles				
Na_{4}Ca_{2}SiP_{4}		hexagonal	P6_{3}mc	a=913 c=617 V=151.5	SiP_{4} tetrahedra		2.128		
Na_{4}Sr_{2}SiP_{4}		hexagonal	P6_{3}mc	a=9.283 c=7.295 V=164			2.498		
Na_{4}Eu_{2}SiP_{4}		hexagonal	P6_{3}mc	a=9.251 c=7.198 V=160.7			3.226		
MgSiP_{2}		tetragonal	I4̅2d	a=5.721 c=10.095				orange yellow; semiconductor band gap 2.24 eV; decomposed by water or acid	
AlSiP_{3}		orthorhombic	Pmnb	a = 9.872, b = 5.861, c = 6.088, Z=4	P-P bonds			black	
K_{2}SiP_{2}		orthorhombic	Ibam	a = 12.926, b = 6.867, c= 6.107, Z=4, V=542.07	one dimensional chain		2.061		
KSi_{2}P_{3}		monoclinic	C2/c	a=10.1327 Å, b=10.1382 Å, c=21.118 Å, β=96.88°, Z=8 V=2153.8Å^{3}	solely fused T3 supertetrahedra		2.321	dark red, band gap 1.72 eV	
KSi_{2}P_{3}		tetragonal	I4_{1}/acd	a =21.922 Å, c = 39.868 Å, Z =128	solely fused T5 supertetrahedra			potassium ion conductor	
Ca_{2}Si_{2}P_{4}			P4_{1}2_{1}2	a = 7.173, c = 26.295				band gap 0.984 eV	
Ca_{3}Si_{2}P_{4}		monoclinic		a = 7.073 Å, b = 17.210 Å, c = 6.918 Å, β = 111.791°				band gap 0.826 eV	
Ca_{3}Si_{8}P_{14}		monoclinic	P2_{1}/c	a = 12.138 Å, b = 13.476 Å, c = 6.2176 Å, β = 90.934°				band gap 0.829 eV	
Ca_{4}SiP_{4}		cubic		a=11.875 V=1675			2.48		
Ca_{2}Li_{4}SiP_{4}		monoclinic	P2_{1}/m	a=6.7229 b=8.2100 c=7.1669 β=90.064 Z=2		395.58	2.182		
MnSiP_{2}		tetrahedral	I 4 2 d	a 5.5823 c 10.230				metallic; SHG 32.8 pm/V	
Fe_{5}SiP				a=6.766 c=12.456 V=493.8 Z=6			6.83		
CoSi_{3}P_{3}		monoclinic	P2_{1}	(pseudo orthrhombic) a = 5.899, b = 5.703, c = 12.736, β = 90.00° Z=4				resistivity 0.62 Ohm cm band gap 0.12 eV	
NiSi_{3}P_{4}		tetragonal	I4̅2m	a = 5.1598 c =10.350 Z = 2			3.22		
NiSi_{2}P_{3}			Imm2	a = 3.505, b = 11.071, c = 5.307, Z = 2					
FeSi_{4}P_{4}				a = 4.876, b = 5.545, c = 6.064, α = 85.33°, β = 68.40°, γ = 70.43° Z=4 P and Si random			3.38	resistivity 0.3 Ohm cm band gap 0.15, can take in Li or Na	
Cu_{4}SiP_{8}			I4_{1}/a	a = 12.186, c = 5.732, Z = 8	P-P bonds				
ZnSiP_{2}		Tetragonal	I4̅2d	a = 5.399 Å c = 10.435 Å Z=4 V=304.173 Å^{3}	chalcopyrite structure SiP_{4} and Zn_{4} tetrahedra	154.936	3.3 (measured)	dark red clear; red luminescent; semiconductor; band gap 2.01 eV	
ZnSiP_{2}		Cubic						over 27 GPa Superconductor T_{c} = 8.2K	
Sr_{2}SiP_{4}								band gap 1.41 eV	
Sr_{4}SiP_{4}		cubic		a=12.426 V=1919			3.48		
SrSi_{7}P_{10}		triclinic	P1	a =6.1521 Å, b =8.0420 Å, c =8.1374 Å, α =106.854°, β =99.020°, γ =105.190°, Z =1	tetrahedral network derived from T2 supertetrahedra			band gap 1.1 eV	
Li_{4}Sr_{2}SiP_{4}		monoclinic	P2_{1}/m	a=7.2919 b=8.3679 c=6.9965 β=90.061 Z=2	isolated SiP_{4}	426.91	2.76	dark red; air sensitive; indirect band gap 2.23 eV	
Mg_{2}Sr_{3}Si_{20}P_{30}		hexagonal	P6_{3}	a = 15.7767 c = 11.7407					
MgSr_{3}Si_{3}P_{7}			P31m	a = 18.7339 c = 6.1393					
RhSi_{3}P_{3}		monoclinic	C2	a=5.525, b=7.210, c=5.522 β=118.31°, Z=2 P and Si random			4.005	black	
RuSi_{4}P_{4}		triclinic	P1	a = 4.936, b = 5.634, c = 6.162, α = 85.51°, β = 68.26°, γ = 70.69° Z=1 V=150			3.74	metallic	
RuSi_{4}P_{4}		triclinic	P1	a=4.9362 b=5.6326 c=6.1649 α=85.5073° β=68.2559° γ=70.6990°			3.732	dark red;band gap 1.9 eV	
AgSiP_{2}		Tetragonal	I4̅2d	6.5275, c = 8.550, Z = 4; V = 364.3	SiP_{4} corner sharing	305.77	5.58	shiny black	
Mg_{2}In_{3}Si_{2}P_{7}		monoclinic	P2_{1}	a 6.9375 b 6.5646 c 14.469 β 103.87° Z=2		639.7	3.458	SHG 7.1 × AgGaS_{2}; band gap 2.21	
Sn_{4.2}Si_{9}P_{16}		rhombohedral	R3	a = 9.504 Å, α = 111.00°, and Z = 1				band gap 0.2	
CdSiP_{2}		tetragonal	I4̅2d	a = 5.680 c = 10.431 Å Z=4 V=336.494 Å^{3}	chalcopyrite structure	202.434	3.995	carmine colour; red luminescent	
Cs_{2}SiP_{2}	Dicesium catena-diphosphidosilicate	Orthorhombic	Ibam						
Cs_{5}SiP_{3}	Pentacesium triphosphidosilicate	Orthorhombic	Pnma	a=6.064, b=14.336, c=15.722	SiP_{3} planar triangles			dark metallic, air sensitive	
BaSi_{7}P_{10}		triclinic	P1	a =6.1537 Å, b =8.0423 Å, c =8.1401 Å, α =106.863°, β =99.050°, γ =105.188°, Z =1	tetrahedral network derived from T2 supertetrahedra				
Ba_{2}SiP_{4}		Tetragonal	I4̅2d	a = 9.90.57 Å, c = 7.31.80 Å; Z = 4 V=718.06 Å	contains P-P bonds	426.65		band gap 1.45 eV	
Ba_{2}SiP_{4}		Orthorhombic	Pnma	a=12.3710 b=4.6296 c=7.9783 Z= 8 V=1443.9	chains of Si-P-Si	426.65	3.925	black band gap 1.7 eV	
Ba_{2}Si_{3}P_{6}								band gap 1.88	
Ba_{3}Si_{4}P_{6}		monoclinic	P2_{1}/m	a=1153.7 Å, b=728.1 Å, c=752.7 Å, β = 99.41° V=623.76 Z=2	Zintl compound P-P and Si-Si bonds		3.78	black metallic	
Ba_{4}SiP_{4}		cubic		a=13.023 V=2219			4.22		
Ba_{4}Li_{16}Si_{3}P_{12}		monoclinic	P2_{1}/c	a=16.6933 b=11.5994 c=29.5092 β=115.277 Z=8	[SiP_{4}]^{8−}, [SiP3]^{5−} and P^{3−}	5166.85	2.870		
BaCuSi_{2}P_{3}		monoclinic		a=4.5659 b=10.1726 c=6.8236 β = 109.311 V=299.10	layered				
BaIn_{2}Si_{7}P_{12}		trigonal	R3	a=13.2045 c=8.9694 Z=3		1354.4	3.440	black; NLO 6 × AGS	
LaSiP_{3}		monoclinic		a = 5.972, b = 25.255, c = 4.168, β= 135.71°, Z = 4	two dimensional network of boat-shaped six-membered rings of Si-P-Si-P-Si-P				
LaSi_{2}P_{6}			Cmc2_{1}	a=10.129 b=28.17 c=10.374 Z=16	P-P bonds	380.9	3.42	grey	
La_{2}Mg_{3}SiP_{6}		orthorhombic	Pnma	a=11.421 b=8.213 c=10.677 Z=4					
CeSiP_{3}		orthorhombic	Pn21a	a = 5.861, b= 5.712, c= 25.295 V=846.7 Å^{3}, Z=8	P-P bonds	261.13	4.095		
CeSi_{2}P_{6}			Cmc21	a= 10.118 b= 28.03 c= 10.311 Z= 16, V=2.924	P-P bonds	382.1	3.47	grey	
Ce_{2}Mg_{3}SiP_{6}		orthorhombic	Pnma	a=11.356 b=8.188 c=10.564 Z=4					
PrSi_{2}P_{6}			Cmc21	a= 10.085 b= 27.95 c= 10.267 Z= 16, V=2.895 nm^{3}	P-P bonds			grey	
NdSi_{2}P_{6}			Cmc21	a= 10.031,b= 27.81,c= 10.245,Z= 16, V=2.857	P-P bonds			grey	
Eu_{2}Li_{4}SiP_{4}		monoclinic	P2_{1}/m	a=6.9016 b=8.3330 c=7.2403 β=90.119 Z=2		416.39	3.857		
ReSi_{4}P_{4}									
OsSi_{4}P_{4}		triclinic	P1	a = 4.948, b = 5.620, c = 6.175, α = 85.65, β = 68.36, γ = 70.89, Z=4 V=150.6			4.72	metallic	
IrSi_{3}P_{3}		monoclinic	C2	a=6.577, b=7.229, c=5.484 β=117.91°, Z=2				black	
IrSi_{3}P_{3}		monoclinic	Cm	a=6.5895 b=7.2470 c=5.4916 β=117.892				dark red;band gap 1.8 eV	
PtSi_{2}P_{2}		monoclinic	P2_{1}	a=6.025 Å, b=9.468 Å, c=11.913 Å, β=102.91°,Z=8, V=552.2			6.327	high resistance metallic, shiny black, air sensitive	
PtSi_{3}P_{2}		triclinic	P1	a=4.840 Å,b=5.482 Å,c=8.052 Å, α=91.57°, β=93.52°, γ=108.14°, Z=2 V=202.3			5.656	shiny black	
AuSiP		rhombohedral	R3m	a=3.459, c = 17.200, Z = 3; V = 178.19		256.03	7.16	shiny black	
Th_{2}SiP_{5}		triclinic		a=4.04.3 Å, b=4.04.5 Å, c = 10.279 pm, α = 90.09°, β = 90.09° and γ = 89.50°, Z = 1	chains of corner linked SiP_{4} tetrahedra, and square net of P				
