= Nitrate nitrite =

Class of chemical compounds

A nitrate nitrite, or nitrite nitrate, is a coordination complex or other chemical compound that contains both nitrite (NO^{−}_{2}) and nitrate (NO^{−}_{3}) anions. They are mixed-anion compounds, and they are mixed-valence compounds. Some have third anions. Many nitrite nitrate compounds are coordination complexes of cobalt. Such a substance was discovered by Wolcott Gibbs and Frederick Genth in 1857.

== Production ==
Mercury(II) nitrate and potassium nitrate in water solution produce the salt tripotassium tetranitratomercurate(II) nitrate K_{3}[Hg(NO_{2})_{4}]NO_{3}.

== Properties ==
On heating, nitrate nitrites lose NO_{2} and NO and yield metal oxides.

== Related ==
Other compounds having an element in two different anion states include the sulfate sulfites, the phosphate phosphites, arsenate arsenites and the selenate selenites.

== List ==
name	formula	ratio NO_{3}:NO_{2}	mw	system	space group	unit cell Å	volume	density	properties	references
	[Cr(NH_{3})_{5}(NO_{2})] ·(NO_{3})_{2}									
trans-dinitrotetraamminecobalt(III) nitrate monohydrate	[Co(NO_{2})_{2}(NH_{3})_{4}]NO_{3}•H_{2}O	1:2		orthorhombic	P2_{1}2_{1}2_{1}	a=10.02, b=6.02, c=16.84, Z=4		1.84		
cis-dinitrotetraamminecobalt(III) nitrate	[Co(NO_{2})_{2}(NH_{3})_{4}]NO_{3}	1:2		orthorhombic	P2_{1}2_{1}2_{1}	a=12.19, b=7.18, c=10.92, Z=4		1.95		
	[cis-β-Co(trien)(NO_{2})_{2}]NO_{3}	1:2		monoclinic	P2_{1}/n	a = 7.604, b = 13.019, c = 14.472, β = 98.13°, Z = 4	1418.26	1.682	racemate	
	[cis-α-Co(tren)(NO_{2})_{2}]NO_{3}•13H_{2}O	1:2			P2_{1}/c					
	trans-Co[(en_{2})(NO_{2})_{2}]NO_{3}	1:2								
	trans-[Co(2,3,2-tet)(NO_{2})_{2}]NO_{3}	1:2	373.21		P2_{1}/n	a=8.490, b=8.884, c=18.580 and β=95.08°;, Z=4	1395.89	1.776		
	trans-[Co(2,3,2-tet)(NO_{2})_{2}]NO_{3}		373.21		Pn	a=6.493, b=11.731, c=9.325 β=100.13°; M.W.=373.21, Z=2)=	699.21	1.773		
	cis-[Co(Hao)_{2}(NO_{2})_{2}]NO_{3} (Hao = 3-amino-3-methyl-2-butanone oxime)			monoclinic	P2_{1}/n	a= 8.1 60, b= 17.250, c= 13.745, β= 104.77°				
	[Co(pic)_{2(}NO_{2})_{2}]NO_{3}.½H_{2}O pic=2-picolylamine									
	cis-[Co(phen)_{2}(NO_{2})_{2}]NO_{3} · 2 H_{2}O phen=1,10-phenanthroline									
Sparteine copper(II) nitrate nitrite	Cu(C_{15}H_{26}N_{2})(NO_{3})(NO_{2})	1:1							green	
trans-diammine-cis-dinitratonitronitrosyl ruthenium(II)	RuNO(NH_{3})_{2}(NO_{3})_{2}(NO_{2})									
bis(nitrotriamminepalladium(II)) tetraamminepalladium(II) tetranitrate	[Pd(NO_{2})(NH_{3})_{3}]_{2}[Pd(NH_{3})_{4}](NO_{3})_{4}	4:1	829.20	tetragonal	I4̅2m	a=7.637 c=21.610 Z=2		2.18	bright yellow	
bis(1,10-Phenanthroline)-(nitroso-O)-(nitrato-O,O')-cadmium(ii)	Cd(phen)_{2}(NO_{3})(NO_{2})			monoclinic	P2_{1}/c	a 6.872 b 9.690 c 20.852 β 93.59°				
catena-((μ_{2}-Nitroso-O,O')-aqua-(nitrato-O,O')-(1,10-phenanthroline)-cadmium(ii))	[Cd(phen)(NO_{3})(NO_{2})(H_{2}O)]_{n}			monoclinic	Cc	a 11.703Å b 15.242 c 13.451 β 106.321°				
	[NO_{2}(NH_{3})_{2}Pt(C_{5}H_{4}NO)_{2}Pt(NH_{3})_{2}NO_{2}](NO_{3})_{2}.H_{2}O								yellow	
	K_{3}[Hg(NO_{2})_{4}]NO_{3}	1:4		orthorhombic	Pnma	a=12.12 b=10.58 c=9.28 Z=4		3.14	pale yellow	
	Pb_{2}(NO_{2})(NO_{3})(SeO_{3})	1:1		orthorhombic	Pmn2_{1}	a=5.529, b=10.357, c=6.811, Z=2	390		colourless	
	K_{2}Pb(NO_{2})_{3}(NO_{3})	1:3	503.4	orthorhombic	Pbca	a = 6.766, b = 11.999, c = 26.61, Z = 8	2160	3.095	yellow orange	
	[Pb_{3}(OH)_{4}Co(NO_{2})_{3}](NO_{3})(NO_{2})·2H_{2}O	1:4		orthorhombic	Pbca	a = 8.9414, b = 14.5330, c = 24.9383, Z = 8	3240.6			
