= Arsenate arsenite =

Chemical compound or salt

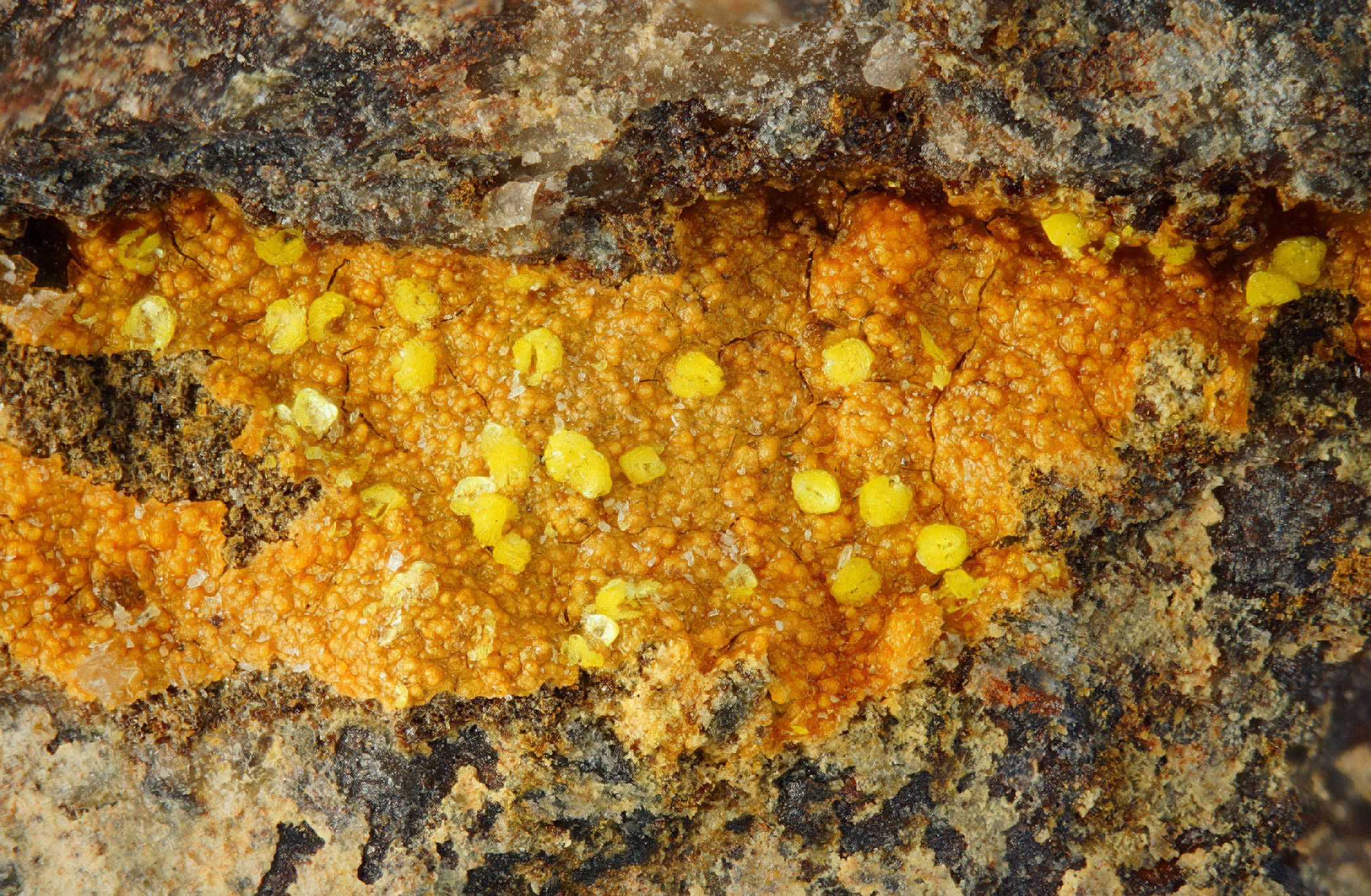
Yellow spherules of halilsarpite, an arsenate arsenite mineral, on orange-brown smolyaninovite

An arsenate arsenite is a chemical compound or salt that contains arsenate and arsenite anions (AsO^{3−}_{3} and AsO^{3−}_{4}). These are mixed anion compounds or mixed valence compounds. Some have third anions. Most known substances are minerals, but a few artificial arsenate arsenite compounds have been made. Many of the minerals are in the Hematolite Group.

An arsenate arsenite compound may also be called an arsenite arsenate.

== Properties ==
Some members of this group of materials like mcgovernite has an extremely high unit cell dimension of 204 Å.

== Related ==
Mixed valence pnictide compounds related to the arsenate arsenites include the nitrite nitrates, and phosphate phosphites.

== List ==
name	formula	ratio AsO^{3−}_{4}:AsO^{3−}_{3}	system	space group	unit cell Å	volume	density	properties	references
Arsenic dioxide	AsO_{2}	1:1	orthorhomnic	Pnma	a=8.597 b=5.235 c=7.269 Z=8	327.1	4.382		
Arsenic(III) Arsenic(V) Oxide Hydroxide	As_{3}O_{5}(OH)	1:2	monoclinic	P2_{1}/c	a = 12.504 b = 4.593 c = 10.976 β = 118.08° Z = 4	556.2	3.84		
	H_{6}As^{3+}_{7}As^{5+}_{7}O_{31}	1:1	hexagonal	P6_{3}	a = 12.0525 c = 4.7344 Z = 2	595.6			
Segerstromite	Ca_{3}(As^{5+}O_{4})_{2}[As^{3+}(OH)_{3}]_{2}	2:1	cubic	I2_{1}3	a = 10.7627 Z = 4	1246.71	3.46	colourless; refract index: n = 1.731	
Synadelphite	Mn^{2+}_{9}(As^{5+}O_{4})_{2}(As^{3+}O_{3})(OH)_{9} · 2H_{2}O	2:1	Orthorhombic	Pnma	a = 10.75 b = 18.86c = 9.88 Z=4	2005	3.58	red; Biaxial (+); refract index: n_{α} = 1.750–1.870 n_{β} = 1.751–1.880 n_{γ} = 1.761–1.930	
Hematolite	(Mn,Mg,Al,Fe^{3+})_{15}(As^{5+}O_{4})_{2}(As^{3+}O_{3})(OH)_{23}	2:1	trigonal	R3̅	a = 8.275 Å, c = 36.60 Å Z=3	2,170.4	3.49	deep red; Uniaxial (−) refractive index n_{ω} = 1.733 n_{ε} = 1.714; Birefringence: 0.019	
Turtmannite	(Mn,Mg)_{22.5}Mg_{3-3x}((V^{5+},As^{5+})O_{4})_{3}(As^{3+}O_{3})_{x}(SiO_{4})_{3}O_{5-5x}(OH)_{20+x}		trigonal		a = 8.259 c = 204.3 Z=12	12,068	3.8	light yellow; Uniaxial(−); refractive index: n_{ε} = 1.787	
Carlfrancisite	Mn^{2+}_{3}(Mn^{2+},Mg,Fe^{3+},Al)_{42}[As^{3+}O_{3}]_{2}(As^{5+}O_{4})_{4}[(Si,As^{5+})O_{4}]_{6}[(As^{5+},Si)O_{4}]_{2}(OH)_{42}		trigonal	R3̅c	a = 8.2238 c = 205.113 Z=6	12,013.5	3.620	yellow-orange; Uniaxial (+) refractive index: n_{ω} = 1.756(2) n_{ε} = 1.758 Birefringence: δ = 0.002	
	K_{2}Cu_{3}(As_{2}O_{6})_{2}	1:1	monoclinic	C2m	a=10.359 b=5.388 c=11.234 β=110.48°			[As(V)As(III)O_{6}]^{4−}	
Dixenite	CuMn^{2+}_{14}Fe^{2+}(SiO_{4})_{2}(As^{5+}O_{4})(As^{3+}O_{3})_{5}(OH)_{6}	1:5	trigonal	R3	a = 8.233 c = 37.499 Z=3	2201	4.35	deep red-brown; Uniaxial (+) refractive index n_{ω} = 1.970 n_{ε} = 1.730	
Arakiite	(Zn,Mn^{2+})(Mn^{2+},Mg)_{12}(Fe^{3+},Al)_{2}(As^{5+}O_{4})_{2}(As^{3+}O_{3})(OH)_{23}	2:1	monoclinic	Cc	a = 14.248 b = 8.228 c = 24.23 β = 93.62° Z=4	2843	3.41	orange-red brown; Biaxial(−); refract index: n_{α} = 1.723 n_{β} = 1.744 n_{γ} = 1.750 Birefringence: 0.027	
Kraisslite	Zn_{3}(Mn,Mg)_{25}(Fe^{3+},Al)(As^{3+}O_{3})_{2}[(Si,As^{5+})O_{4}]_{10}(OH)_{16}	5:1	Orthorhombic	C222_{1}	a = 8.1821 b = 14.1946 c = 43.9103 Z=4	5099.8	3.876	pale red; Uniaxial (+) Refractive index: n_{ε} = 1.805	
Mcgovernite	Mn_{19}Zn_{3}(AsO_{4})_{3}(AsO_{3})(SiO_{4})_{3}(OH)_{21}	3:1	trigonal	R3m or R3̅m	a = 8.22 c = 203.1 Z=6	11,887.52	3.719	brown; Uniaxial (+) Refractive index: n_{ω} = 1.757 n_{ε} = 1.760 Birefringence: δ = 0.003	
Halilsarpite	[Mg(H_{2}O)_{6}][CaAs^{3+}_{2}(Fe^{3+}_{2.67}Mo^{6+}_{0.33})(AsO_{4})_{2}O_{7}]		orthorhomnic	Imma	a = 26.489 b = 7.4205 c = 10.4378	2051.7		lemon yellow; Biaxial(−) refractive index: n_{α} = 1.646 n_{β} = 1.765(5) n_{γ} = 1.815(5) 2V: 62° Max Birefringence: δ = 0.169	
Wiklundite	Pb_{2}(Mn^{2+},Zn)_{3}(Fe^{3+},Mn^{2+})_{2}(Mn^{2+},Mg)_{19}(As^{3+}O_{3})_{2}[(Si,As^{5+})O_{4}]_{6}(OH)_{18}Cl_{6}		hexagonal	? R3̅c	a = 8.257 c = 126.59 Z = 6	7474	4.072	dark reddish brown	
	Bi_{8}O_{6}(AsO_{3})_{2}(AsO_{4})_{2}		monoclinic	I2/a	a=24.372 b=5.528 c=29.90 β=99.058 Z=8	3978	7.652	colourless	
	Th(As^{III}_{4}As^{V}_{4}O_{18})	1:1	monoclinic	C2/c	a=18.2148 b 5.19792 c=17.3588 β=99.1298 Z=4	1622.70	4.582	colourless	
