= Tellurite tellurate =

Class of chemical compounds

A tellurite tellurate is a chemical compound or salt that contains tellurite and tellurate anions [TeO_{3}]^{2-} [TeO_{4} ]^{2-}. These are mixed anion compounds, meaning the compounds are cations that contain one or more anions. Some have third anions. Environmentally, tellurite [TeO_{3}]^{2-} is the more abundant anion due to tellurate's [TeO_{4} ]^{2-} low solubility limiting its concentration in biospheric waters. Another way to refer to the anions is tellurium's oxyanions, which happen to be relatively stable.

== Naming ==
A tellurite tellurate compound may also be called a tellurate tellurite. Compounds that contain the anions follow basic nomenclature rules, the cation is named first, followed by the anion. As individual ions current IUPAC naming conventions dictate that compounds containing what was conventionally known as the tellurite ion, [TeO_{3}]^{2-}, be named as tellurate (IV) compounds, while other tellurates are labeled tellurate (VI) compounds. Furthering confusion, a number of other tellurate oxyanions exist, including pentoxotellurate, [TeO_{5}]^{4-}, and ditellurate, [Te_{2}O_{10}]^{8-}. Additionally, a number of compounds that do not even include tellurium oxyanions still have "tellurate" in their names, as in the case of octafluoridotellurate, [TeF_{8}]^{2-}.

== Production ==
One way to produce a tellurite tellurate compound is by heating oxides together. Tellurite tellurate compounds can also occur naturally as minerals such as Carlfriesite Ca[Te^{4+}_{2}Te^{6+}O_{8}].

== Properties ==
Tellurite tellurate compounds can crystalize under certain conditions. Monoclinic and orthorhombic dominate crystal structures of the tellurite tellurates. Most compounds are transparent from near ultraviolet to near infrared. Te-O bonds cause absorption lines in infrared. Sodium tellurite exhibit

== Related ==
Related to these are the selenate selenites and sulfate sulfites by varying the chalcogen.

== List ==
name	formula	ratio TeO_{3}:TeO_{4}	mw	system	space group	unit cell Å	volume	density	optical	references
	NH_{4}Te_{2}O_{5}(OH)	1:1	370.24	orthorhombic	Pnma	a=7.340 b=5.546 c=13.164 Z=4	535.9	4.50		
	K_{2}Te_{4}O_{12}	1:3	780.59	monoclinic	C2/m	a=12.360 b=7.248 c=11.967 β =105.68 Z=4	1032.2	5.03		
	K_{4}[Te_{5}^{6+}Te_{3}^{4+}]O_{23}	3:5	1545.18	orthorhombic	Pna2_{1}	a = 19.793, b = 14.664, c = 7.292, Z = 4				
Carlfriesite	Ca[Te^{4+}_{2}Te^{6+}O_{8}]	2:1	550.87	monoclinic	C2/c	a=12.576 b=5.662 c=9.884 β=115.56		6.3		
	K_{4}V_{6}[Te_{2}^{4+}Te^{6+}]O_{24}	2:1	1228.83	trigonal	R3̅c	a = 9.7075, c = 42.701, Z = 6	3484.9			
	Co^{2+}_{6}(Te^{6+}O_{6})(Te^{4+}O_{3})_{2}Cl_{2}	2:1	999.30	tetragonal	P4_{2}/mbc	a = 8.59 c = 5.91				
	Rb_{4}[Te_{5}^{6+}Te_{3}^{4+}]O_{23}	3:5	1730.66	orthorhombic	Pna2_{1}	a = 19.573, b = 14.448, c = 7.273, Z = 4				
	Rb_{4}V_{6}[Te_{2}^{4+}Te^{6+}]O_{24}	2:1	1414.31	trigonal	R3̅c	a = 9.8399, c = 43.012, Z = 6	3606.6			
	Sr[Te^{4+}_{2}Te^{6+}O_{8}]	2:1	598.42	tetragonal	P4_{2}/m	a=6.8321 c=6.7605				
	SrCuTe_{2}O_{7}	1:1	518.36	orthorhombic	Pbcm	a = 7.1464, b = 15.061, c = 5.4380, Z = 4	585.3			
	NaYTe_{2}O_{7}	1:1	479.10	monoclinic	P2_{1}/n	a=6.7527 b=7.5077 c=11.8867 β =99.935 Z=4	593.59	5.361		
	RbTe_{1·25}Mo_{0·75}O_{6}					a=10.469				
	(Ag,Na)_{2}Te_{4}O_{15 x=0.4}	2:2		monoclinic	P2_{1}/c	a = 6.333, b = 24.681, c = 7.308, β = 110.84° Z = 4				
	Ag_{2}[Te^{4+}Te^{6+}O_{6}]	1:1	566.93	monoclinic	P21/m	a=5.4562 b=7.4009 c=6.9122 β=101.237				
	Ag_{2}[Te^{4+}_{2}Te^{6+}_{2}O_{11}]	2:2	902.13	triclinic	P1̅	a=7.287 b=7.388 c=9.686 α=95.67 β=94.10 γ=119.40				
	Cd_{2}Te^{4+}Te^{6+}O_{7}	1:1	592.02	monoclinic	P2_{1}/c	a=9.3039 b=7.3196 c=13.2479 β=122.914				
	Cs_{2}Te^{4+}Te_{3}^{6+}O_{12}	1:3	968.20	rhombohedral	R3̅m	a=7.2921 c=18.332				
	CsTe_{2}O_{6–x}	1:1	484.10	cubic						
	CsTe_{2}O_{6–x}	1:1	484.10	orthorhombic						
	BaTe_{2}O_{6}	1:1	488.52	orthorhombic	Cmcm	a=5.569 b=12,796 c=7.320 Z=4		6.19		
	BaMgTe_{2}O_{7}	1:1	528.83	orthorhombic	Ama2	a = 5.558, b = 15.215, c = 7.307 Z = 4	617.9		SHG 5 × KDP	
	CsTe_{1·13}Mo_{0·864}O_{6}					a=10.643				
	BaCoTeO_{3}TeO_{4}	1:1	563.46	orthorhombic	Ama2					
	BaCuTeO_{3}TeO_{4}	1:1	568.07	orthorhombic	Ama2	a = 5.4869, b =15.412, c = 7.2066, Z = 4.	609.42			
	BaZnTe_{2}O_{7}		569.91	orthorhombic	Ama2	a = 5.5498, b = 15.316, c = 7.3098, Z = 4	621.34		SHG 5 × KDP	
	CeV_{3}Te_{3}O_{15}(OH)_{3}·2H_{2}O		995.74	hexagonal	P6_{3}/mmc	a=12.166 c=12.537 Z=4	1606.9	4.116	dark red	
	PrV_{3}Te_{3}O_{15}(OH)_{3}·2H_{2}O		996.53	hexagonal	P6_{3}/mmc	a=12.1147 c=12.4949 Z=4	1588.1	4.168	dark red	
	NdV_{3}Te_{3}O_{15}(OH)_{3}·H_{2}O		983.86	hexagonal	P6_{3}/mmc	a=12.1075 c=12.4572 Z=4	1581.5	4.132	dark red	
	SmV_{3}Te_{3}O_{15}(OH)_{3}·H_{2}O		989.97	hexagonal	P6_{3}/mmc	a=12.1068 c=12.4509 Z=4	1580.5	4.160	dark red	
	EuV_{3}Te_{3}O_{15}(OH)_{3}·H_{2}O		991.58	hexagonal	P6_{3}/mmc	a=12.0731 c=12.3674 Z=4	1561.2	4.219	dark red	
	GdV_{3}Te_{3}O_{15}(OH)_{3}·H_{2}O		996.87	hexagonal	P6_{3}/mmc	a=12.0745 c=12.3701 Z=4	1561.9	4.239	dark red	
	RbTe_{1·5}W_{0·5}O_{6}					a=10.462				
	CsTe_{1·625}W_{0·375}O_{6}					a=10.543				
	α-Hg_{2}Te_{2}O_{7}	1:1	768.38	monoclinic	C2/c	a=12.910 b=7.407 c=13.256 β =112.044 Z=8				
	β-Hg_{2}Te_{2}O_{7}	1:1	768.38	orthorhombic	Aea2	a=7.441, b=23.713 ,c=13.522, Z=16				
	PbCuTe_{2}O_{7}	1:1	637.94	orthorhombic	Pbcm	a = 7.2033, b = 15.047, c = 5.4691, Z = 4	592.78			
	Bi[(Bi^{3+}Te^{4+})Te^{6+}O_{8}]		801.16							
	(Ca,Pb)_{3}CaCu_{6}[Te^{4+}_{3}Te^{6+}O_{12}]_{2}(Te^{4+}O_{3})_{2}(SO_{4})_{2}		3111.30	trigonal	P3 2 1	a=9.1219(17), c=11.9320(9)		4.65	Viridian green	
