= Wiklundite =

Arsenite-silicate mineral

General
- Category: Silicate
- Formula: Pb_{2}(Mn^{2+},Zn)_{3}(Fe^{3+},Mn^{2+})_{2}(Mn^{2+},Mg)_{19}(As^{3+}O_{3})_{2}(Si,As^{5+}O_{4})_{6}(OH)_{18}Cl_{6}
- IMA symbol: Wik
- Crystal system: Trigonal
- Crystal class: Hexagonal scalenohedral (3̅m); H-M symbol: (3̅ 2/m)
- Space group: R3̅c
- Unit cell: a = 8.26, c = 126.59 [Å] (approximated)

Identification

Wiklundite is a rare and complex arsenate arsenite-silicate mineral with the chemical formula Pb_{2}(Mn^{2+},Zn)_{3}(Fe^{3+},Mn^{2+})_{2}(Mn^{2+},Mg)_{19}(As^{3+}O_{3})_{2}(Si,As^{5+}O_{4})_{6}(OH)_{18}Cl_{6}. The mineral characterizes in a large c unit cell parameter. It was found in Långban, Sweden - a home for many rare and exotic minerals.

== Relation to other minerals ==
Structure of wiklundite is unique. A slightly chemically similar mineral, although lacking manganese and iron, is hereroite.
