= Phosphate phosphite =

Class of chemical compounds

A phosphate phosphite is a chemical compound or salt that contains both phosphate and phosphite anions (PO^{3−}_{4} and PO^{3−}_{3}). These are mixed anion compounds or mixed valence compounds. Some have third anions.

Phosphate phosphites frequently occur as metal-organic framework compounds which are of research interest for gas storage, detection or catalysis. In these phosphate and phosphite form bridging ligands to hard metal ions. Protonated amines are templates.

== Naming ==
A phosphate phosphite compound may also be called a phosphite phosphate.

== Production ==
Phosphate phosphite compounds are frequently produced by hydrothermal synthesis, in which a water solution of ingredients is enclosed in a sealed container and heated. Phosphate may be reduced to phosphite or phosphite oxidised to phosphate in this process.

== Related ==
Related to these are the nitrite nitrates and arsenate arsenites.

== List ==
name	formula	ratio PO_{4}:PO_{3}	mw	system	space group	unit cell (Å)	volume	density	properties	references
1,4-Diammoniumbutane	[(H_{3}N(CH_{2})_{4}NH_{3})_{2}][Sc_{5}F_{4}(HPO_{3})_{6}(H_{2}PO_{3})_{2}(PO_{4})]	1:8	1300.8	monoclinic	C2/m	a = 12.888, b = 14.835, c = 10.531, β = 103.093°, Z = 2 (at 93 K)	1961.2			
Imidazole	[C_{3}N_{2}H_{5}]_{2}[V^{III}_{4}(H_{2}O)_{3}(HPO_{3})_{4}(HPO_{4})_{3}]	3:4	1003.766	trigonal	P3̅c1	a = 13.499, c = 18.120, Z = 12	2280.35	2.143	green	
	(C_{3}H_{10}NO)_{6}[V_{8}(H_{2}O)_{6}(PO_{4})_{2}(HPO_{3})_{12}]	2:12		trigonal	P3̅c1	a = 13.5393, c = 18.2283	2893.8		green	
	(C_{4}H_{8}N_{2})_{3}[V_{8}(H_{2}O)_{6}(PO_{4})_{2}(HPO_{3})_{12}]	2:12		trigonal	P3̅c1	a = 13.4922, c = 18.3589	2894.3		green	
L=cyclopentylammonium	(L)_{4}[V_{9}(H_{2}O)_{6}(HPO_{3})_{10.5}(HPO_{4})_{3.5}(H_{2}PO_{4})_{3}]			hexagonal	P6_{3}/m	a=13.4107 c =27.5678 Z=1	4293.7	1.81		
	Mn_{5}(μ-OH_{2})_{2}(PO_{4})_{2}(HPO_{3})_{2}·2H_{2}O	2:2								
Iron(III) 2,2′-bipyridine phosphite−phposphate	[Fe^{III}(2,2′-bipyridine)(HPO_{3})(H_{2}PO_{4})]	1:1		monoclinic		a = 10.5407, b = 6.4298, c = 10.6172, β = 113.890°, Z = 2		1.878	colourless	
	Fe^{III}(1,10-phenanthroline)(HPO_{3})(H_{2}PO_{3})	1:1		monoclinic	P2_{1}/m	a = 10.180, b = 6.424, c = 11.6668, β = 115.59°, Z = 4	668.2	1.880	yellow	
	{[C_{3}H_{4}N_{2}]_{2}[C_{5}NH_{5}]_{14}[H_{15}(Mo_{2}O_{4})_{8}Co_{16}(PO_{4})_{14}(HPO_{3})_{10}(OH)_{3}]}·5H_{2}O	14:10	6685.09	monoclinic	C2/m	a = 29.724, b = 24.623, c = 20.687, β = 126.760°, Z = 2	12130	1.830	red	
Tris(4-pyridyl)triazine zinc phosphate–phosphite	C_{54}H_{60}N_{18}O_{42}P_{10}Zn_{9}	?	2531.23	hexagonal	P6_{3}	a = 15.6464, c = 19.788, Z = 2	4195.2		yellow	
1-(2-Aminoethyl)piperazine tetrazinc diphosphate diphosphite	(C_{6}H_{17}N_{3})[Zn_{4}(PO_{4})_{2}(HPO_{3})_{2}]	2:2		monoclinic	Cc	a = 5.327, b = 17.146, c = 22.071, β = 94.58°, Z = 4	2009.5			
Zinc phosphate-phosphite	trans-(C_{6}H_{15}N_{2})_{2}Zn_{4}(PO_{4})_{2}(HPO_{3})_{2}	2:2	841.78	monoclinic	P2_{1}/n	a = 9.706, b = 9.993, c = 27.557, β = 96.795°, Z = 4	2654.0	2.107		
1,3-Cyclohexanebis(methylamine)	[H_{2}CHBMA][Zn_{1.5}Mn(HPO_{3})_{2.5}(PO_{4})]·5H_{2}O	1:5		monoclinic	C2/c	a = 33.929, b = 13.045, c = 8.971, β = 104.37°, Z = 2	3846.5			
2-Hydroxypropylammonium dizinc hydrogenphosphite phosphate	[C_{3}H_{6}(OH)NH_{3}][Zn_{2}(HPO_{3})(PO_{4})]	1:1		triclinic	P1̅	a = 5.302, b = 8.934, c = 12.686, α = 74.35°, β = 88.54°, γ = 73.94°				
(Bis(Cyclohexane-1,3-bis(methylammonium)) bis(μ_{4}-phosphato)-tetrakis(μ_{3}-hydrogen phosphito)-manganese-tetra-zinc dihydrate)	[H_{2}CHBMA][Zn_{2}Mn_{0.5}(PO_{4})(HPO_{3})_{2}]·H_{2}O	1:2		monoclinic	C2/c	a = 33.929, b = 13.045, c = 8.971, β = 104.37°, Z = 4	3846			
Triethylenetetramine	[C_{6}N_{4}H_{22}]_{0.5}[Zn_{3}(PO_{4})_{2}(HPO_{3})]	2:1								
Zinc potassium phosphite phosphate										
N,N,N′,N′-tetramethylenediamine (TMEDA)	(C_{6}N_{2}H_{18})_{2}(C_{6}N_{2}H_{17})Ga_{15}(OH)_{8}(PO_{4})_{2}(HPO_{4})_{12}(HPO_{3})_{6}·2H_{2}O	14:6			P3̅	a = 19.046, c = 8.331, Z = 1	2617.1			
Zirconium phosphate phosphite	γ-ZrPO_{4}·HPO_{2}(OH)·2H_{2}O	1:1							layered	
Cadmium 1,10-phenanthroline phosphate phosphite oxalate	Cd_{2}(phen)_{2}(H_{2}PO_{4})(H_{2}PO_{3})(C_{2}O_{4})	1:1							chains	
catena-(Tris(hexane-1,6-diaminium) octakis(μ_{3}-phosphonato)-hexakis(μ_{3}-phosphato)-tris(μ_{2}-hydrogen phosphato)hexaaqua-nonaindium	[In_{9}(H_{2}O)_{6}(HPO_{3})_{13}(H_{2}PO_{3})_{2}(PO_{4})(HPO_{4})][(C_{6}N_{2}H_{18})_{3}]	2:15		hexagonal	P6_{3}/m	a = 13.7676, c = 28.062				
4-Bipyridine	(C_{10}H_{10}N_{2})_{1.5}(H_{3}O)_{3}[In_{18}(H_{2}O)_{12}(HPO_{4})_{12}(HPO_{3})_{16}(H_{2}PO_{3})_{6}]	12:16		hexagonal	P6_{3}/m	a = 13.784, c = 28.058	4617			
catena-(Bis(propane-1,3-diammonium)-octakis(μ_{3}-phosphito)-pentakis(μ_{2}-hydrogen phosphito)-(μ_{2}-dihydrogenphosphato)-hexaindium)	[In_{6}(HPO_{3})_{8}(H_{2}PO_{3})_{5}(H_{2}PO_{4})]·(C_{3}N_{2}H_{12})_{2}	1:11		orthorhombic	Pna2_{1}	a = 26.7974, b = 9.8459, c = 18.5441, Z = 4	4892.8			
	Pb_{2}Al(HPO_{3})_{3}(H_{2}PO_{4})	1:3		orthorhombic	Cmcm					
	Pb_{2}Ga(HPO_{3})_{3}(H_{2}PO_{4})	1:3		orthorhombic	Cmcm					
	Pb_{2}Al(HPO_{3})_{2}(HPO_{4})(H_{2}PO_{4})	2:2		orthorhombic	Cmcm					
Rubidium uranium(VI,IV) phosphate-phosphite	Rb_{2}[(UO_{2})_{2}(U^{IV})(PO_{4})_{2}(HPO_{3})_{2}(H_{2}O)]	2:2	1316.94	monoclinic	C2/c	a = 16.2421, b = 10.5049, c = 11.0936, β = 98.745°	1870.8	4.702	orange-yellow	
Caesium uranium(IV) phosphate-phosphite	Cs_{2}[U^{IV}_{3}(PO_{4})_{2}(HPO_{3})_{4}]	2:4	1489.76	monoclinic	C2/m	a = 25.7396 b = 5.5906, c = 7.6334, β = 98.964°, Z = 2	1085.03	4.560	blue-green	
Caesium uranium(VI,IV) phosphate-phosphite	Cs_{2}[(UO_{2})(U^{IV})(HPO_{4})_{2}(HPO_{3})_{2}]	2:2	1123.78	triclinic	P1̅	a = 6.8571, b = 11.1190, c = 12.0391, α = 63.861°, β = 77.481°, γ = 79.331°, Z = 2	800.22	4.664	yellow-orange	
	Cs_{4}[(UO_{2})_{8}(HPO_{4})_{5}(HPO_{3})_{5}]·4H_{2}O	5:5		monoclinic	C2/c	a = 18.5005, b = 10.971, c = 14.4752, β = 104.513°			yellow	
	Cs_{4}[U^{IV}_{6}(PO_{4})_{8}(HPO_{4})(HPO_{3})]	9:1		orthorhombic	Pmmn	a = 6.9321, b = 26.935, c = 10.9137			pale green	
	Cs_{10}[U^{IV}_{10}(PO_{4})_{4}(HPO_{4})_{14}(HPO_{3})_{5}]·H_{2}O	15:5		monoclinic	C2/m	a = 19.2966, b = 20.2914, c = 13.9293, β = 126.839°			green	
	Tl_{3}[(UO_{2})_{2}(H_{1.5}PO_{4})(H_{0.5}PO_{4})(H_{1.5}PO_{3})_{2}]	2:2	1503.07	tetragonal	P4_{2}/mbc	a = 13.5382, c = 19.4008, Z = 8	3555.8	5.615	yellow-green	
	Tl_{2}[(UO_{2})_{2}(U^{IV})(H_{2}O)(PO_{4})_{2}(HPO_{3})_{2}]	2:2	1550.71	monoclinic	C2/c	a = 16.2360, b = 10.4995, c = 11.0003, β = 99.027°, Z = 4	1851.99	5.562	light green	
