= Sulfite sulfate =

Class of chemical compounds

A sulfite sulfate is a chemical compound that contains both sulfite and sulfate anions [SO_{3}]^{2−} [SO_{4}]^{2−}. These compounds were discovered in the 1980s as calcium and rare earth element salts. Minerals in this class were later discovered. Minerals may have sulfite as an essential component, or have it substituted for another anion as in alloriite. The related ions [O_{3}SOSO_{2}]^{2−} and [(O_{2}SO)_{2}SO_{2}]^{2−} may be produced in a reaction between sulfur dioxide and sulfate and exist in the solid form as tetramethylammonium salts. They have a significant partial pressure of sulfur dioxide.

Related compounds are selenate selenites and tellurate tellurites with a varying chalcogen. They can be classed as mixed valent compounds.

== Production ==
Europium and cerium rare earth sulfite sulfates are produced when heating the metal sulfite trihydrate in air.

Ce_{2}(SO_{3})_{3}·3H_{2}O + 1/2 O_{2} → Ce_{2}(SO_{3})_{2}SO_{4} + 3 H_{2}O

Ce_{2}(SO_{3})_{3}·3H_{2}O + O_{2} → Ce_{2}SO_{3}(SO_{4})_{2} + 3 H_{2}O

Other rare earth sulfite sulfates can be crystallized as hydrates from a water solution. These sulfite sulfates can be made by at least three methods. One is to dissolve a rare earth oxosulfate in water and then bubble in sulfur dioxide. The second way a rare earth oxide is dissolved in a half equivalent of sulfuric acid. The third way was to bubble sulfur dioxide through a suspension of rare earth oxide in water until it dissolved, then let it sit around for a few days with limited air exposure. To make calcium sulfite sulfate, a soluble calcium salt is added to a mixed solution of sodium sulfite and sodium sulfate.

Control of pH is important when attempting to produce solid sulfite compounds. In basic conditions sulfite easily oxidises to sulfate and in acidic conditions it easily turns into sulfur dioxide.

== Properties ==
In the sulfite sulfates, sulfur has both a +4 and a +6 oxidation state.

The crystal structure of sulfite sulfates has been difficult to study, as the crystal symmetry is low, crystals are usually microscopic as they are quite insoluble, and they are mixed with other related phases. So they have been studied via powder X-ray diffraction.

== Reactions ==
When heated in the absence of oxygen, cerium sulfite sulfate hydrate parts with water by 400 °C. Up to 800° it loses some sulfur dioxide. From 800° to 850 °C it loses sulfur dioxide and disulfur resulting in cerium oxy disulfate, and dioxy sulfate, which loses some further sulfur dioxide as it is heated to 1000 °C. Over 1000° the remaining oxysulfates decompose to sulfur dioxide, oxygen and cerium dioxide. This reaction is studied as a way to convert sulfur dioxide into sulfur and oxygen using only heat.

Another thermochemical reaction for cerium sulfite sulfate hydrate involves using iodine to oxidise the sulfite to sulfate, producing hydrogen iodide which can then be used to make hydrogen gas and iodine. When combined with the previous high temperature process, water can be split into oxygen and hydrogen using heat only. This is termed the GA sulfur-iodine cycle.

== Applications ==
Calcium sulfite sulfate hydrate is formed in flue gas scrubbers that attempt to remove sulfur dioxide from coal burning facilities. Calcium sulfite sulfate hydrate is also formed in the weathering of limestone, concrete and mortar by sulfur dioxide polluted air. These two would be classed as anthropogenic production as it was not deliberately produced or used.

== List ==
name	formula	ratio SO_{3}:SO_{4}	mw	system	space group	unit cell	volume	density	optical	references
tricalcium disulfite sulfate dodecahydrate Orschallite	Ca_{3}(SO_{3})_{2}SO_{4}•12H_{2}O	2:1		rhombohedral	R3̅c	a=11.3514 c=28.412 a = 11.350 c = 28.321 Z=6	3170 3159.7	1.87	Uniaxial (+) n_{ω} = 1.4941 n_{ɛ} = 1.4960	
Hielscherite	Ca_{3}Si(OH)_{6}(SO_{4})(SO_{3})·11H_{2}O	1:1		hexagonal	P6_{3}	a = 11.1178 c = 10.5381 Z=2	1128.06	1.82	Uniaxial (−) n_{ω} = 1.494 n_{ε} = 1.476	
pentamanganese tetrahydroxide disulfite disulfate dihydrate	Mn_{5}(OH)_{4}(H_{2}O)_{2}[SO_{3}]_{2}[SO_{4}]	2:1	634.9	monoclinic	P2_{1}/m	a = 7.6117 b = 8.5326 c = 10.9273 β = 101.600° Z = 2	695.2	3.0321	pink	
	Y_{2}(SO_{3})_{2}SO_{4}•2.5H_{2}O	2:1								
Barium sulfite sulfate_{3,7}	Ba(SO_{3})_{0.3}(SO_{4})_{0.7}	2:7		orthorhombic	Pnma	a=8.766 b=5.46 c=7.126				
lanthanum disulfite sulfate tetrahydrate	La_{2}(SO_{3})_{2}SO_{4}•4H_{2}O	2:1								
cerium disulfite sulfate	Ce_{2}(SO_{3})_{2}SO_{4}	2:1								
cerium disulfite sulfate tetrahydrate	Ce_{2}(SO_{3})_{2}SO_{4}•4H_{2}O	2:1								
cerium sulfite disulfate	Ce_{2}SO_{3}(SO_{4})_{2}	1:2								
neodymium disulfite sulfate tetrahydrate	Nd_{2}(SO_{3})_{2}SO_{4}•4H_{2}O	2:1								
	Nd(SO_{3})(HSO_{4})(H_{2}O)_{3}	1:1	374.41	triclinic	P1̅	a=6.5904 b=6.9899 c=9.536 α=101.206 β=97.767 γ=92.823 Z=2	425.67	2.921	light violet	
	Nd(SO_{3})(HSO_{4})	1:1		triclinic	P1̅	a=6.4152 b=6.6232 c=6.9955 α=91.726 β=92.438 γ=92.423 Z=2	296.55	3.610	light violet	
ethylenediammonium bis-(neodymium sulfite sulfate hydrate)	C_{2}H_{10}N_{2}[Nd(SO_{3})(SO_{4})H_{2}O]_{2}	1:1	738.87	monoclinic	P2_{1}/c	a=9.0880 b=6.9429 c=13.0805 β=91.55 Z=2	825.04	2.974	pink	
	Sm_{2}(SO_{3})_{2}SO_{4}•2.5H_{2}O	2:1								
europium disulfite sulfate	Eu_{2}(SO_{3})_{2}SO_{4}	2:1								
europium sulfite disulfate	Eu_{2}SO_{3}(SO_{4})_{2}	1:2								
	Tb_{2}(SO_{3})_{2}SO_{4}•2.5H_{2}O	2:1								
poly[diaqua-μ(4)-sulfato-di-μ(4)-sulfito-didysprosium(III)]	Dy_{2}(SO_{3})_{2}SO_{4}•2H_{2}O	2:1	617.21	monoclinic	C2/c	a = 11.736 b = 6.8010 c = 12.793 β = 102.686° Z=4	996.1	4.115	colourless	
	Ho_{2}(SO_{3})_{2}SO_{4}•2.5H_{2}O	2:1								
	Er_{2}(SO_{3})_{2}SO_{4}•2.5H_{2}O	2:1								
	Yb_{2}(SO_{3})_{2}SO_{4}•2.5H_{2}O	2:1								
Complexes
	[OsO_{2}(SO_{3})(SO_{4})(NH_{3})_{2}]^{2−}	1:1								
