= Selenate selenite =

Class of chemical compounds

A selenate selenite is a chemical compound or salt that contains selenite and selenate anions (SeO^{2−}_{3} and SeO^{2−}_{4} respectively). These are mixed anion compounds. Some have third anions.

== Naming ==
A selenate selenite compound may also be called a selenite selenate.

== Production ==
One way to produce a selenate selenite compound is to evaporate a water solution of selenate and selenite compounds.

== Properties ==
On heating, selenate selenites lose SeO_{2} and O_{2} and yield selenites, and ultimately metal oxides.

== Related ==
Related to these are the sulfate sulfites and tellurate tellurites. They can be classed as mixed valent compounds.

== List ==
name	formula	ratio SeO_{4}:SeO_{3}	M_{w}	system	space group	unit cell Å	volume	density	properties	references
Boroseleniteselenate	B_{2}Se_{3}O_{10}	1:2		monoclinic	P2_{1}/c	a = 4.3466, b = 7.0237, c = 22.1460, β = 94.922°, Z = 4			colourless hygroscopic	
	Na_{2}(SeO_{4})(H_{2}SeO_{3})·H_{2}O	1:1		orthorhombic	Cmc2_{1}	a=9.615, b=11.19, c=9.62 Z=4				
	Sc_{2}(SeO_{3})_{2}(SeO_{4})	1:2		monoclinic	P2_{1}/c	a = 6.5294, b = 10.8557, c = 12.6281, β = 103.543° Z = 4	870.21			
	Sc_{2}(TeO_{3})(SeO_{3})(SeO_{4})	1:1		monoclinic	P2_{1}/c	a = 6.535, b = 10.970, c = 12.559, β = 102.70° Z = 4	878.3			
	Fe(SeO_{4})(HSeO_{3})·H_{2}O	1:1		monoclinic	P2_{1}/c	a=8.355,b=8.696,c=9.255, β=93.72°,Z=4	670.95			
Lithium sesquicopper selenite selenate	Li_{2}Cu_{3}(SeO_{3})_{2}(SeO_{4})_{2}	2:2		monoclinic	I2/a	a=16.293,b=5.007,c=14.448, β = 94.21°, Z=4	1175.5			
	RbFe(SeO_{3})(SeO_{4})	1:1				a=5.339, c=41.206, Z=6	1040.2			
	Y_{2}(SeO_{3})_{2}(SeO_{4})(H_{2}O)_{2}·H_{2}O_{0.75}	1:2		monoclinic	C2/c	a=11.9118 b=6.8886 c=12.9644 β=103.839°			UV cut off 211 nm	
	Zr(SeO_{3})(SeO_{4})	1:1		orthorhombic	Pbca	a = 8.291, b = 9.458, c = 15.357, Z = 8	1204.2			
	Zr_{4}(SeO_{3})(SeO_{4})_{7}	7:1		monoclinic	P2_{1}/n	a = 5.313, b = 10.704, c = 10.484, β = 104.13°, Z = 1	578.2			
	Zr_{3}(SeO_{3})(SeO_{4})_{5}·2H_{2}O	5:1		triclinic	P1	a = 5.273, b = 8.079, c = 11.959, α = 82.60°, β = 88.27°, γ = 89.87°, Z = 1	505.1			
	Ag_{4}(Mo_{2}O_{5})(SeO_{4})_{2}(SeO_{3})	2:1		orthorhombic	Pbcm	a=5.6557, b=15.8904, c=15.7938, Z=4	1419.4			
tricadmium(II) bis-[selenite(IV)] selenate(VI)	Cd_{3}(SeO_{3})_{2}(SeO_{4})	1:2		monoclinic	P2_{1}	a=8.302 b=5.337 c=10.843 β =108.641 Z=2	876.32	4.539	SHG 0.6×KDP; stable to 482 °C	
	(NH_{4})_{4}Cd(HSe^{IV}O_{3})_{2}(Se^{VI}O_{4})_{2}	2:2		triclinic	P1̅	a = 5.791 b = 7.411 c = 10.736 α = 90.05° β = 105.02° γ = 112.61°	408.2			
	Ag_{2}Cd(Se_{2}O_{5})(Se_{0.3}S_{0.7}O_{4})		676.19	triclinic	P1̅	a=6.7485 b=6.8504 c=9.769 α=101.36° β=105.96° γ=91.159° Z=2	424.41	5.291	yellow	
	Sb_{2}(SeO_{3})_{2}SeO_{4}	1:2	640.38	monoclinic	I2/a	a=8.1184 b=7.4572 c=14.7625 β=94.892° Z=4	890.47	4.777	birefringence 0.158 @ 546	
	La_{2}(HSeO_{3})(SeO_{4})· 2H_{2}O	1:1		monoclinic	P2_{1}/n	a=7.272 b=9.409 c=11.940 β =93.32°				
	NaLa(SeO_{3})(SeO_{4})	1:1		monoclinic	P2_{1}/c	a=10.751 b=7.098 c=8.437 β =90.90°				
	Pr_{4}(SeO_{3})_{2}(SeO_{4})F_{6}	1:2		monoclinic	C2/c	a = 22.305, b = 7.1054, c = 8.356, β = 98.05°, Z = 4			light green	
dineodymium diselenite selenate	Nd_{2}(SeO_{3})_{2}(SeO_{4}) · 2H_{2}O	1:2	721.39	monoclinic	C2/c	a = 12.276, b = 7.0783, c = 13.329, β = 104.276°	1122.4	4.27	pink	
	NaSm(SeO_{3})(SeO_{4})	1:1		monoclinic	P2_{1}/c	a = 10.669, b = 6.9166, c = 8.2588, β = 91.00° Z = 4			light yellow	
	Er_{2}(SeO_{3})_{2}(SeO_{4}) · 2H_{2}O	1:2		monoclinic	C2	a=11.935 b=6.881 c=6.473 β =103.79° Z=4				
	Hf(SeO_{3})(SeO_{4})(H_{2}O)_{4}	1:1		orthorhombic						
	Au_{2}(SeO_{3})_{2}(SeO_{4})	1:2		orthorhombic	Cmc2_{1}	a = 16.891, b = 6.3013, c = 8.327, Z = 4	886.2		orange yellow	
	Hg_{2}(SeO_{3})(SO_{4})	1:1	624.20	monoclinic		a=6.3799 b=7.0185 c=13.4426 β=94.511° Z=4	600.06	6.909	birefringence 0.133@532 nm and 0.126@1064 nm	
	Hg_{3}(SeO_{3})_{2}(SeO_{4})	1:2		monoclinic	P2_{1}	a = 8.3979 b = 5.3327 c = 11.148 β = 108.422° Z = 2	473.67		colourless	
	Hg_{3}Se(SeO_{3})(SO_{4})			monoclinic	P2_{1}/n	a=7.1188 b=9.9209 c=12.4565 β=95.398° Z=4	875.84	6.854	colourless; band gap 3.5 eV; birefringence 0.069@546 nm	
	Hg_{5}O(SeO_{3})(SeO_{4})	1:1	1288.87		C2/c	a=17.563 b=6.188 c=18.912 β =90.379 Z=8	2055.2	8.331	yellow	
	Hg_{3}Hg_{2}Hg(HgO_{2})(SeO_{3})_{2}(SeO_{4})·H_{2}O	1:2			R3	a=5.9239 c=37.096 Z=3				
	Hg_{3}Hg_{2}Hg_{2}(HgO_{2})(SeO_{3})_{2}(SeO_{4})_{2}·H_{2}O	2:1			P3_{1}c	a=5.8908 c=31.048 Z=2				
	Ag_{4}Hg(SeO_{3})_{2}(SeO_{4})	1:2	1028.95	orthorhombic	Cmc2_{1}	a=8.1690 b=11.9903 c=10.8870 Z=4	1066.4	6.409	398 nm cutoff NLO 0.35×KDP	
	La_{2}Hg_{3}(SeO_{3})_{4}(SO_{4})_{2}(H_{2}O)_{2}	4:2	1611.55	triclinic		a=9.1127 b=9.2446 c=13.5562 α=86.099 β=79.267 γ=61.814 Z=2	988.73	5.413		
	Pb_{2}(SeO_{3}) (SeO_{4})	1:1	684.30	orthorhombic	Pnma	a=13.5080 b=5.6238 c=9.2706 Z=4	704.25	6.454	stable to 232 °C	
schmiederite	Pb_{2}Cu_{2}(OH)_{4}(SeO_{3})(SeO_{4})	1:1		monoclinic	P2_{1}/m	a = 9.922, b = 5.712, c = 9.396, β = 101.96°, Z = 2				
	Bi_{2}(SeO_{3})_{2}(SeO_{4})	1:2	814.84	monoclinic	I2/a	a= 8.0440 b=7.4377 c=14.7456 β =97.274 Z=4	875.11	6.184	colourless	
	Ag_{2}Bi_{2}(SeO_{3})_{3}(SeO_{4})	1:3	1157.54	monoclinic	P2_{1}/m	a=9.5380 b=5.4965 c=11.8207 β =92.892 Z=2	618.92	6.211	339 nm cutoff	
	Th(SeO_{3})(SeO_{4})	1:1		monoclinic	P2_{1}/c	a=7.0351 b=9.5259 c=9.02266 β =103.128, Z=4				
	(H_{3}O)[(UO_{2})(SeO_{4})(SeO_{2}OH)]	1:1		monoclinic	P2_{1}/n	a = 8.668, b = 10.655, c = 9.846, β = 97.88°	900.7			
	[C_{5}H_{14}N][(UO_{2})(SeO_{4})(SeO_{2}OH)]	1:1		monoclinic	P2_{1}/n	a=11.553, b=10.645, c=12.138, β=108.05, Z=4				
	[C_{5}H_{14}N]_{4}[(UO_{2})_{3}(SeO_{4})_{4}(HSeO_{3})(H_{2}O)]·(H_{2}SeO_{3})(HSeO_{4})	5:2		triclinic	P1̅	a = 11.7068, b = 14.816, c = 16.977, α = 73.899°, β = 76.221°, γ = 89.361°, Z = 2	2743.0			
catena-(bis(Dimethylammonium) oxonium tetrakis(μ_{3}-selenato)-(μ_{2}-selenito)-aqua-hexaoxo-tri-uranium selenous acid)	[C_{2}H_{8}N]_{2}[H_{3}O][(UO_{2})_{3}(SeO_{4})_{4}(HSeO_{3})(H_{2}O)](H_{2}SeO_{3})_{0.2}	4:1.2		monoclinic	P2_{1}/m	a 8.3116 b 18.6363 c 11.5623 β =97.582°				
catena-(tris(Dimethylammonium) tetrakis(μ_{3}-selenato)-(μ_{2}-hydrogen selenito)-aqua-hexaoxo-tri-uranium dimethylamine)	[C_{2}H_{8}N]_{3}(C_{2}H_{7}N)[(UO_{2})_{3}(SeO_{4})_{4}(HSeO_{3})(H_{2}O)]	4:1		orthorhombic	Pnma	a =11.659 b =14.956 c =22.194				
	[NH_{3}(CH_{2})_{9}NH_{3}][(UO_{2})(SeO_{4})(SeO_{2}OH)](NO_{3})	1:1		triclinic	P1̅	a = 10.7480, b = 13.8847, c = 14.636, α = 109.960°, β = 103.212°, γ = 90.409°, Z= 4	1990.0			
	Cs_{2}(H_{2}O)_{5}[(UO_{2})_{7}(SeO_{4})_{2}(SeO_{3})_{2}O_{4}]. H_{2}O	2:2		monoclinic	P2_{1}/m	a =.1381, b =15.0098, c =15.1732 β=91.17°				
