= Arakiite =

General
- Category: Minerals
- Formula: (Zn,Mn^{2+})(Mn^{2+},Mg)_{12}(Fe^{3+},Al)_{2}(As^{3+}O_{3})(As^{5+}O_{4})_{2}(OH)_{23}
- IMA symbol: Ark

Identification
- Color: Red-brown to orange-brown
- Mohs scale hardness: 3-4
- Luster: Earthy
- Streak: Pale-brown, red-brown
- Diaphaneity: Translucent, Opaque
- Specific gravity: 3.41
- Density: 3.41 g/cm3

Arakiite (IMA symbol: Ark) is a rare mineral with the formula (Zn,Mn^{2+})(Mn^{2+},Mg)_{12}(Fe^{3+},Al)_{2}(As^{3+}O_{3})(As^{5+}O_{4})_{2}(OH)_{23}. It is both arsenate and arsenite mineral, a combination that is rare in the world of minerals. Arakiite is stoichiometrically similar to hematolite. It is one of many rare minerals coming from the famous Långban manganese skarn deposit in Sweden. Other minerals bearing both arsenite and zinc include kraisslite and mcgovernite.

The mineral crystallizes in the monoclinic crystal system in space group Cc.
