= Blowpipe (tool) =

Tool used to direct a stream of gas

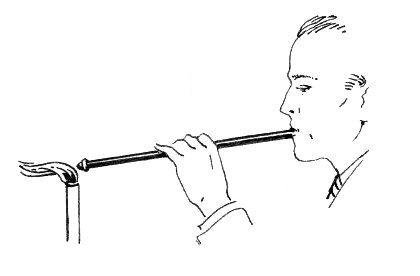
Manual blowpipe

A blowpipe is one of several tools used to direct streams of gases into any of several working media.

== Blowpipes for torches ==
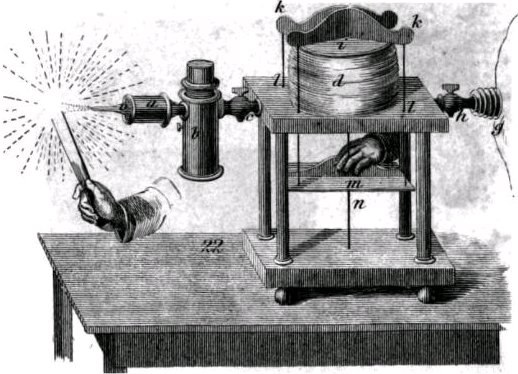
Diagram of a bellows-operated blowpipe, circa 1827, from A Practical Treatise on the Use of the Blowpipe

If a stream or jet of air is directed through a flame, fuel air mixing is enhanced and the jet exiting the flame is intensely hot. Jewelers and glassblowers engaged in lampwork have used the blowpipe since ancient times, with the blast being powered by the user's lungs. For small work, a mouth-blown blowpipe may be used with a candle flame or an alcohol lamp, with established techniques for applying oxidizing and reducing flames to the workpiece or specimen. Starting in the late 18th Century, blowpipes have been powered by mechanisms, initially bladders and bellows, but now blowers, compressors and compressed gas cylinders are commonplace. While blowing air is effective, blowing oxygen produces higher temperatures, and it is also practical to invert the roles of the gasses and blow fuel through air. Contemporary blowtorches and oxy-fuel welding and cutting torches can be considered to be modern developments of the blowpipe.

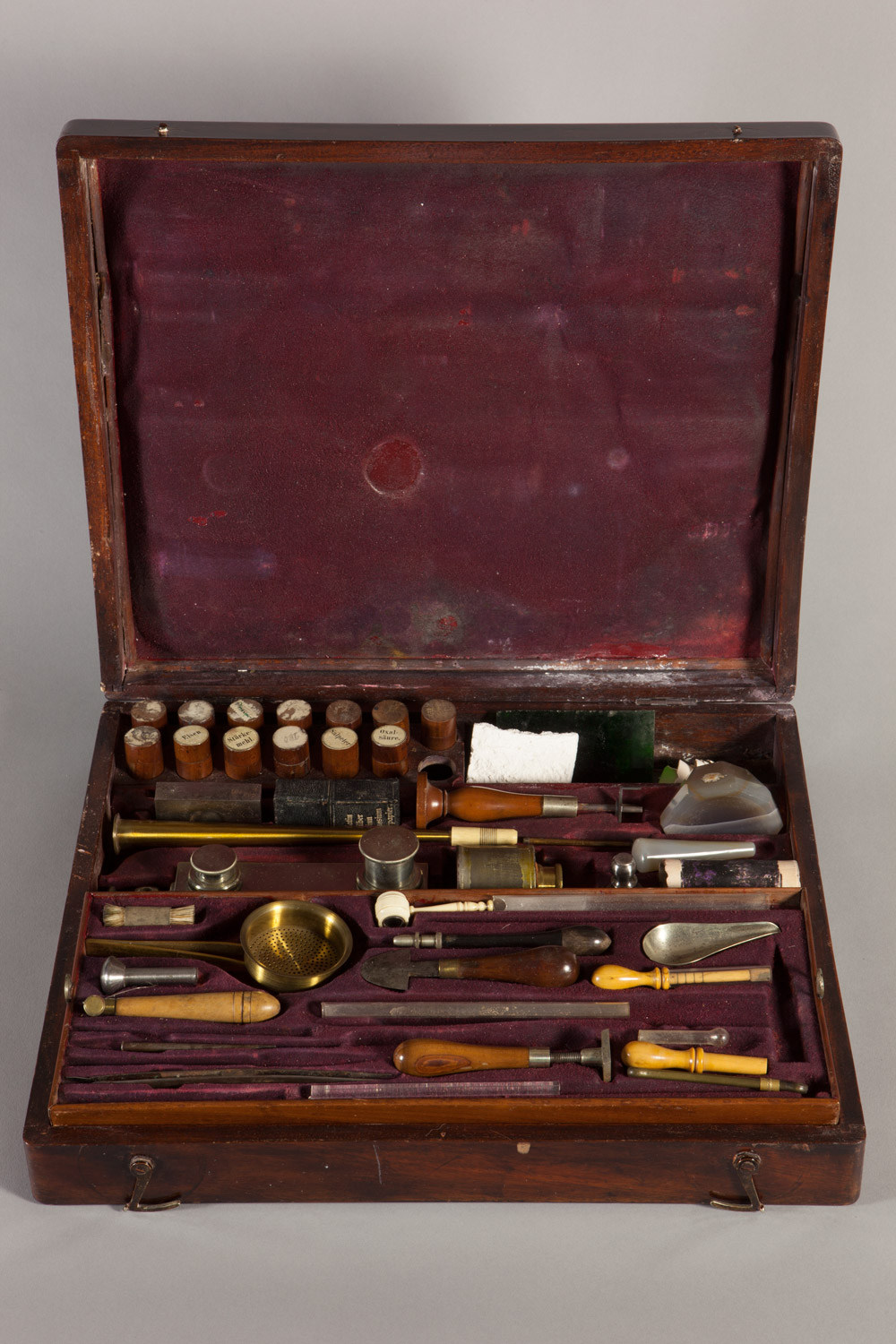
Kit for blowpipe analysis Carl Osterland, Freiberg, c. 1870

In chemistry and mineralogy blowpipes have been used as scientific instruments for the analysis of small samples since about 1738, according to the accounts of Torbern Bergman. One Andreas Swab, a Swedish metallurgist and Counsellor of the College of Mines is credited with the first use of the blowpipe for 'pyrognostic operations', of which no record remains. The next person of eminence who used the blowpipe was Axel Fredrik Cronstedt, who put it to the purpose of the discrimination of minerals by means of fusible reagents. In 1770, an English translation of Cronstedt's work was made by Von Engestrom, annexed to which was a treatise on the blowpipe. Despite this opening, assay by blowpipe was for the time an occupation undertaken for the most part in Sweden. Bergman's use of the blowpipe outstripped all of his predecessors, and he widened its application from mineralogy to inorganic chemistry, giving rise to what may be regarded as a masterpiece of philosophical investigation, De Tubo Ferruminatorio, published in Vienna in 1779 (and translated into English in 1788). Bergman's assistant, Johan Gottlieb Gahn, is credited with improving the design and application of the blowpipe. Gahn travelled with a portable blowpipe, applying it to every kind of chemical and mineralogical enquiry, such as proving the presence of copper in the ashes of vegetables. Gahn published a Treatise on the Blowpipe, which was reprinted a number of times in contemporary chemistry textbooks. Jöns Jakob Berzelius worked with Gahn to ascertain in a systematic manner of the phenomena presented by different minerals when acted on by the blowpipe. He established, according to Griffin, the notion that the blowpipe was an instrument of indispensable utility, and his published work, later translated into English, was regarded as one of the most useful books on practical chemistry extant.

The blowpipes of all of the foregoing blasted air into a flame. The blow pipe was used by the Egyptians at around 200 BCE and to today. Antoine Lavoisier is credited as the first to blow oxygen—of which he was co-discoverer—through a blowpipe to support the combustion of charcoal, in 1782. Others, such as Edward Daniel Clarke, employed hydrogen, and later mixed hydrogen and oxygen in the oxy-hydrogen blowpipe. The vastly increased temperatures, and the volatility of hydrogen-oxygen mixes drove on the development of the so-called gas blowpipe as a tool, and at the same time brought many new materials into reach of the blowpipe as a tool for assay. Robert Hare was a noted exponent of the improved tool. Goldsworthy Gurney, whilst at the Surrey Institute, published in 1823 an account of a new blowpipe so constructed as to enable the operator to produce a flame of great size, power and brilliancy by burning large quantities of the mixed gases with the utmost safety. Gurney went on to employ the principles in his Bude light.

== Blowpipes in glassblowing ==
In glassblowing, the term blowpipe refers to a pipe used to blow a bubble of air into a gather of molten glass, as the first step in the creation of hand-blown glass bottles and bowls. By the end of the first century, the two primary glassblowing tools were the iron blowpipe and pontil. Glassblowing blowpipes are long enough to keep the gather of molten glass at a safe distance from the glassblower and rigid enough to support the weight of the glass when the pipe is held horizontally.

== Blowpipes in ironmaking ==
The term blowpipe is also used to refer to the pipe used to blow deliver air to the tuyeres of a forge or blast furnace. The blowpipe of a forge may be considered to be a large bellows operated version of a mouth-blown blowpipe, directing air through a coal or charcoal flame.

== Blowpipes for fireplaces or outdoor fires ==
Blowpipes are also known as "mouth bellows" (soufflet à bouche), "blow pokers", or just "blow pokes". They are used to start and stoke fires.

Blowpipes are straight, tube-like tools primarily used to direct oxygen to boost a wooden fire. Blowpipes have been in use for hundreds of years, but were first documented by John Joseph Griffin in his 1827 book A Practical Treatise on the Use of the Blowpipe.

Blow pokers are multifunctional fire irons. Primarily they are used to arrange the embers or firewood in a wood fire (the poker), secondarily they are used as a blow pipe. The term "BlowPoker" was introduced in 2005 by the German company Red Anvil GmbH, a manufacturer of fire irons and fireside accessories. Their BlowPoker also has a plate to arrange the ashes. Since 2005, the term blow poker has established itself in the trade as a generic term for a multifunctional poker tool.

== See also ==
- Flame test
- Spark testing
