= Microcosmic salt =

Chemical compound found in urine

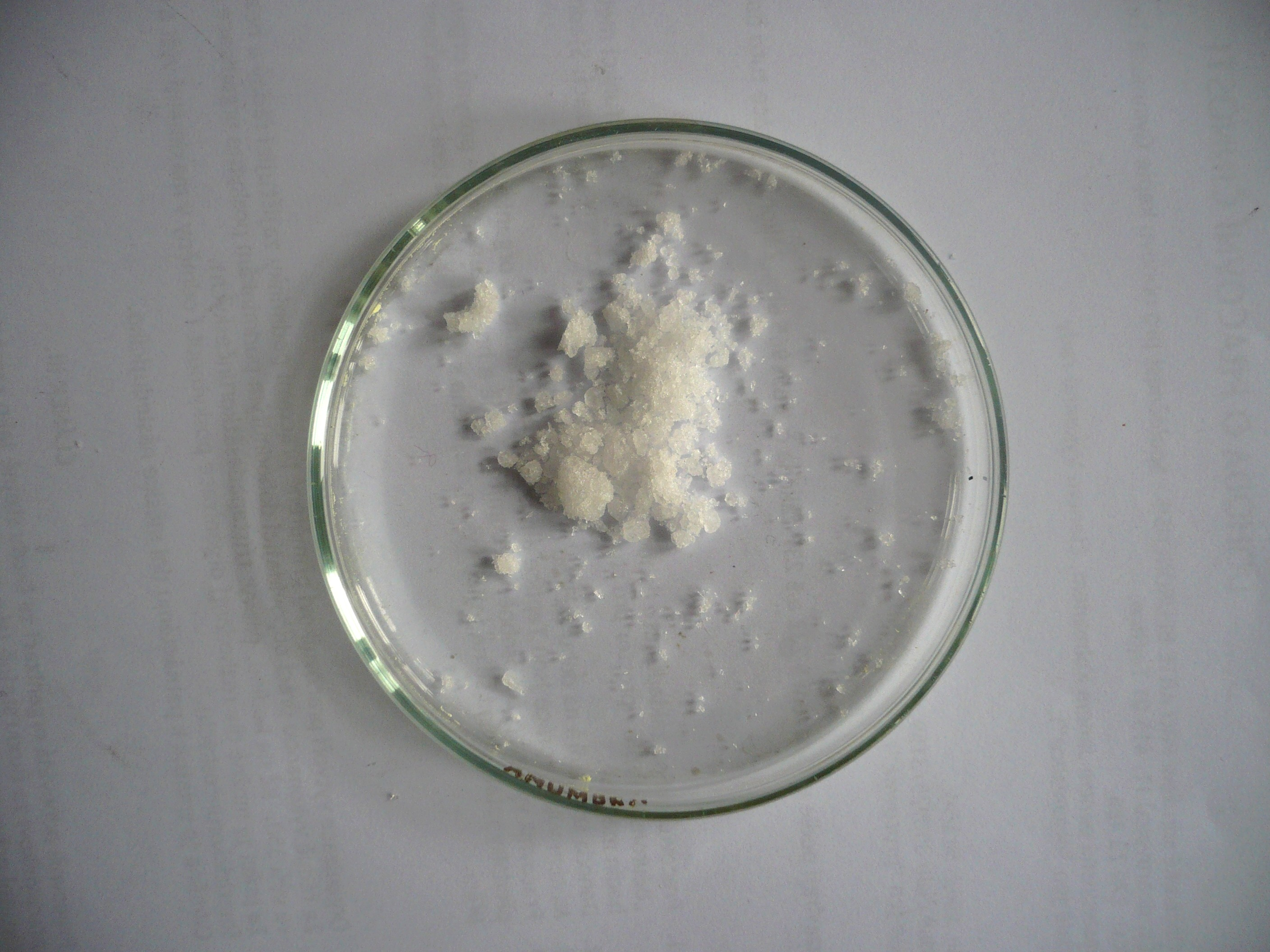

Names
- IUPAC name Ammonium sodium phosphate
- Other names Microcosmic salt, ammonium sodium hydrogen phosphate or phosphorsalz

Identifiers
CAS Number	7783-13-3
3D model (JSmol)	Interactive image
ChemSpider	140225
ECHA InfoCard	100.128.899
EC Number	250-787-1
PubChem CID	159458
UNII	K78U8WLV4H
CompTox Dashboard (EPA)	DTXSID30718863
- InChI: InChI=1S/H3N.Na.H3O4P/c;;1-5(2,3)4/h1H3;;(H3,1,2,3,4)/q;+1;/p-1 Key: CUXQLKLUPGTTKL-UHFFFAOYSA-M; InChI=1/H3N.Na.H3O4P/c;;1-5(2,3)4/h1H3;;(H3,1,2,3,4)/q;+1;/p-1 Key: CUXQLKLUPGTTKL-REWHXWOFAM
- SMILES: [NH4+].OP(=O)([O-])[O-].[Na+]

Properties
Chemical formula	Na(NH_{4})HPO_{4}
Molar mass	137.0077 g/mol
Appearance	odorless crystals
Density	1.544 g/cm^{3}
Melting point	80 °C (176 °F; 353 K)
Solubility in water	5 parts cold, 1 part boiling water. Practically insoluble in ethanol

Structure
Crystal structure	Monoclinic
- Except where otherwise noted, data are given for materials in their standard state (at 25 °C [77 °F], 100 kPa). verify (what is ?) Infobox references

Microcosmic salt (see infobox for systematic names) is a salt found in urine with the formula Na(NH_{4})HPO_{4}. It is left behind in the residues after extracting the urea from dried urine crystals with alcohol. In the mineral form, microcosmic salt is called stercorite.

Its name was coined in Latin (sal microcosmicum) by Paracelsus in the 16th century, but it was also referenced by Pseudo-Geber in the late Middle Ages; another alchemical name for it was sal urinae fixum (as opposed to sal urinae volatile). The first extraction of pure phosphorus came from this salt in the 17th century, when Hennig Brandt attempted to extract gold from urine.

Microcosmic salt is used in the laboratory as an essential ingredient of the microcosmic salt bead test for identification of metallic radicals on the basis of the color they produce in oxidizing or reducing flame, in hot or cold conditions.

Microcosmic salts form a tetrahydrate.
