= Americium(III) phosphate =

Chemical compound

Identifiers
3D model (JSmol)	Interactive image
- InChI: InChI=1S/Am.H3O4P/c;1-5(2,3)4/h;(H3,1,2,3,4)/q+3;/p-3 Key: SWXYZYSLAXZROU-UHFFFAOYSA-K
- SMILES: [O-]P(=O)([O-])[O-].[Am+3]

Properties
Chemical formula	AmPO_{4}
Molar mass	338 g·mol^{−1}
Solubility in water	Insoluble

Structure
Crystal structure	Monazite
- Except where otherwise noted, data are given for materials in their standard state (at 25 °C [77 °F], 100 kPa). Infobox references

Americium(III) phosphate is an inorganic compound of americium, with the molecular formula AmPO_{4}. It is the trivalent americium salt of phosphoric acid.

== Preparation ==
The reaction between americium dioxide and diammonium phosphate under an argon atmosphere at 1200°C for 6 hours produces polycrystalline americium phosphate.

AmO_{2} + (NH_{4})_{2}HPO_{4} → AmPO_{4} + 2 NH_{3} + H_{2}O + ^{1}/_{2} O_{2}

It is also a minor constituent of plutonium(III) phosphate as americium-241 is a decay product of plutonium-241.

Americium phosphate could be produced in spilled nuclear waste from the PUREX process as the tributyl phosphate in it can be biodegraded to phosphate ions that can react with americium. The product remains in the ground as it isn't soluble in water.

== Properties ==
Hydrated americium phosphate crystalizes as a rhabdophane-like crystal. The hemihydrate crystalizes as a hexagonal crystal. The anhydrous form crystalizes as a monazite-like crystal.

It is insoluble in water.

Even though americium-241 is highly radioactive, the monazite crystal structure is still partially present after 2 years of self irradiation. As such, americium phosphate could be used to safely store americium in a radioisotope thermoelectric generator for space exploration.
