= Qualitative inorganic analysis =

Analytical method used to investigate elemental composition of inorganic compounds

Classical qualitative inorganic analysis is a method of analytical chemistry which seeks to find the elemental composition of inorganic compounds. It is mainly focused on detecting ions in an aqueous solution, therefore materials in other forms may need to be brought to this state before using standard methods. The solution is then treated with various reagents to test for reactions characteristic of certain ions, which may cause color change, precipitation and other visible changes. Qualitative inorganic analysis was universally taught in most universities until the 1980's either in inorganic chemistry or in analytical chemistry classes. Since then, it has disappeared even in the curricula of chemistry majors, due to its limited use by chemistry professionals.

== Physical appearance of some inorganic compounds ==
	Salt	Colour
1	MnO, MnO_{2}, FeO, CuO, Co_{3}O_{4}, Ni_{2}O_{3}; sulfides of Ag^{+}, Cu^{+}, Cu^{2+}, Ni^{2+}, Fe^{2+}, Co^{2+}, Pb^{2+}, Hg^{2+}, Bi^{3+}, Hg, BiI_{3}, Bi(s), Cu(SCN)_{2}, Sb(s), Hg_{2}O(s), Cu[C(=NH)S]_{2}(s)	Black
2	Hydrated Cu^{2+} salts, Co[Hg(SCN)_{4}](s),	Blue
3	HgO, HgI_{2}, Pb_{3}O_{4}, Hg_{2}CrO_{4}(s), Ag_{2}CrO_{4}(s),	Red
4	Cr^{3+}, Ni^{2+}, hydrated Fe^{2+} salts, Hg_{2}I_{2}(s), Cu(C_{7}H_{6}O_{2}N)_{2}(s), CuHAsO_{3}(s),	Green
5	Hydrated Mn^{2+} salts	Light Pink
6	KO_{2}, K_{2}Cr_{2}O_{7}, Sb_{2}S_{3}, Ferrocyanide, HgO, Sb_{2}S_{3}(s), Sb_{2}S_{5}(s)	Orange
7	Hydrated Co^{2+} salts	Reddish Pink
8	Chromates, AgBr, As_{2}S_{3}, AgI, PbI_{2}, CdS, PbCrO_{4}(s), Hg_{2}CO_{3}(s), Ag_{3}PO_{4}(s), Bi(C_{6}H_{3}O_{3})(s), Cu(CN)_{2}(s), Ag_{3}AsO_{3}(s), (NH_{3})_{3}[As(Mo_{3}O_{10})_{4}](s), [SbI_{6}]^{3-}(aq),	Yellow
9	CdO, Fe_{2}O_{3}, PbO_{2}, CuCrO_{4}, Ag_{2}O(s), Ag_{3}AsO_{4}(s),	Brown
10	PbCl_{2}(s), Pb(OH)_{2}(s), PbSO_{4}(s), PbSO_{3}(s), Pb_{3}(PO_{4})_{2}(s), Pb(CN)_{2}(s), Hg_{2}Cl_{2}(s), Hg_{2}HPO_{4}(s), Al(OH)_{3}(s), AgCl(s), AgCN(s), Ag_{2}CO_{3}(s), Bi(OH)_{2}NO_{3}(s), Bi(OH)_{3}(s), CuI(s), Cd(OH)_{2}(s), Cd(CN)_{2}(s), MgNH_{4}Also_{4}(s), SbO.Cl(s), Sb_{2}O_{3}(s),	White

== Detecting cations ==
According to their properties, cations are usually classified into six groups. Each group has a common reagent which can be used to separate them from the solution. To obtain meaningful results, the separation must be done in the sequence specified below, as some ions of an earlier group may also react with the reagent of a later group, causing ambiguity as to which ions are present. This happens because cationic analysis is based on the solubility products of the ions. As the cation gains its optimum concentration needed for precipitation it precipitates and hence allowing us to detect it. The division and precise details of separating into groups vary slightly from one source to another; given below is one of the commonly used schemes.

=== 1st analytical group of cations ===
The 1st analytical group of cations consists of ions which form insoluble chlorides. As such, the group reagent to separate them is hydrochloric acid, usually used at a concentration of 1–2 M. Concentrated HCl must not be used, because it forms a soluble complex ([PbCl_{4}]^{2−}) with Pb^{2+}. Consequently, the Pb^{2+} ion would go undetected.

The most important cations in the 1st group are Ag^{+}, Hg^{2+}_{2}, and Pb^{2+}. The chlorides of these elements cannot be distinguished from each other by their colour - they are all white solid compounds. PbCl_{2} is soluble in hot water, and can therefore be differentiated easily. Ammonia is used as a reagent to distinguish between the other two. While AgCl dissolves in ammonia (due to the formation of the complex ion [Ag(NH_{3})_{2}]^{+}), Hg_{2}Cl_{2} gives a black precipitate consisting of a mixture of chloro-mercuric amide and elemental mercury. Furthermore, AgCl is reduced to silver under light, which gives samples a violet colour.

The silver ammonia complex can react with bismuth ions and iodide to generate orange or brown Ag_{2}BiI_{5} precipitate.

PbCl_{2} is far more soluble than the chlorides of the other two ions, especially in hot water. Therefore, HCl in concentrations which completely precipitate Hg^{2+}_{2} and Ag^{+} may not be sufficient to do the same to Pb^{2+}. Higher concentrations of Cl^{−} cannot be used for the before mentioned reasons. Thus, a filtrate obtained after first group analysis of Pb^{2+} contains an appreciable concentration of this cation, enough to give the test of the second group, viz. formation of an insoluble sulfide. For this reason, Pb^{2+} is usually also included in the 2nd analytical group.

A signature reaction of lead ions involve the formation of a yellow lead chromate precipitate upon treatment with chromate ions. This precipitate doesn't dissolve in ammonia (unlike Cu(II) and Ag(I)) or acetic acid (unlike Cu(II) and Hg(II)).

This group can be determined by adding the salt in water and then adding dilute hydrochloric acid. A white precipitate is formed, to which ammonia is then added. If the precipitate is insoluble, then Pb^{2+} is present; if the precipitate is soluble, then Ag^{+} is present, and if the white precipitate turns black, then Hg^{2+}_{2} is present.

Hg^{2+}_{2} ions, after oxidation in the presence of chloride ions to HgCl_{4}^{2-}, can form a characteristic orange-red precipitate of Cu_{2}HgI_{4} with the addition of Cu^{2+} and I^{−}.

Confirmation test for Pb^{2+}:

Pb^{2+} + 2 KI → PbI_{2} + 2 K^{+}
Pb^{2+} + K_{2}CrO_{4} → PbCrO_{4} + 2 K^{+}

Confirmation test for Ag^{+}:

Ag^{+} + KI → AgI + K^{+}
2Ag^{+} + K_{2}CrO_{4} → Ag_{2}CrO_{4} + 2 K^{+}

Confirmation test for Hg^{2+}_{2}:

Hg^{2+}_{2} + 2 KI → Hg_{2}I_{2} + 2 K^{+}
2 Hg^{2+}_{2} + 2 NaOH → 2 Hg_{2}O + 2 Na^{+} + H_{2}O

=== 2nd analytical group of cations ===
The 2nd analytical group of cations consists of ions which form acid-insoluble sulfides. Cations in the 2nd group include: Cd^{2+}, Bi^{3+}, Cu^{2+}, As^{3+}, As^{5+}, Sb^{3+}, Sb^{5+}, Sn^{2+}, Sn^{4+} and Hg^{2+}. Pb^{2+} is usually also included here in addition to the first group. Although these methods refer to solutions that contain sulfide (S^{2−}), these solutions actually only contain H_{2}S and bisulfide (HS^{−}). Sulfide (S^{2−}) does not exist in appreciable concentrations in water.

The reagent used can be any substance that gives S^{2−} ions in such solutions; most commonly used are hydrogen sulfide (at 0.2-0.3 M), thioacetamide (at 0.3-0.6 M), addition of hydrogen sulfide can often prove to be a lumbersome process and therefore sodium sulfide can also serve the purpose. The test with the sulfide ion must be conducted in the presence of dilute HCl. Its purpose is to keep the sulfide ion concentration at a required minimum, so as to allow the precipitation of 2nd group cations alone. If dilute acid is not used, the early precipitation of 4th group cations (if present in solution) may occur, thus leading to misleading results. Acids beside HCl are rarely used. Sulfuric acid may lead to the precipitation of the 5th group cations, whereas nitric acid oxidises the sulfide ion in the reagent, forming colloidal sulfur.

The precipitates of these cations are almost indistinguishable, except for CdS, which is yellow. All the precipitates, except for HgS, are soluble in dilute nitric acid. HgS is soluble only in aqua regia, which can be used to separate it from the rest. The action of ammonia is also useful in differentiating the cations. CuS dissolves in ammonia forming an intense blue solution, whereas CdS dissolves forming a colourless solution. The sulfides of As^{3+}, As^{5+}, Sb^{3+}, Sb^{5+}, Sn^{2+}, Sn^{4+} are soluble in yellow ammonium sulfide, where they form polysulfide complexes.

This group is determined by adding the salt in water and then adding dilute hydrochloric acid (to make the medium acidic) followed by hydrogen sulfide gas. Usually it is done by passing hydrogen sulfide over the test tube for detection of 1st group cations. If it forms a reddish-brown or black precipitate then Bi^{3+}, Cu^{2+}, Hg^{2+} or Pb^{2+} is present. Otherwise, if it forms a yellow precipitate, then Cd^{2+} or Sn^{4+} is present; or if it forms a brown precipitate, then Sn^{2+} must be present; or if a red orange precipitate is formed, then Sb^{3+} is present.

Pb^{2+} + K_{2}CrO_{4} → PbCrO_{4} + 2 K^{+}

Confirmation test for copper:

2 Cu^{2+} + K_{4}[Fe(CN)_{6}] + CH_{3}COOH → Cu_{2}[Fe(CN)_{6}] + 4 K^{+}
Cu^{2+} + 2 NaOH → Cu(OH)_{2} + 2 Na^{+}
Cu(OH)_{2} → CuO + H_{2}O (endothermic)
(Another very sensitive test for copper utilizes the fact that Cu^{2+} can serve as a catalyst for the oxidation of thiosulfate ions by Fe^{3+} ions. In the absence of Cu^{2+}, Fe^{3+} can form the purple complex Fe(S_{2}O_{3})_{2}^{−} without undergoing redox. If the added sample contains Cu^{2+}, the solution will rapidly discolor.)

Confirmation test for bismuth:

Bi^{3+} + 3 KI (in excess) → BiI_{3} + 3 K^{+}
BiI_{3} + KI → K[BiI_{4}]
Bi^{3+} + H_{2}O (in excess) → BiO^{+} + 2 H^{+}
(Bismuth ions can form th bright yellow complex Bi(tu)_{3}^{3+} in the presence of thiourea under acidic conditions, which can be precipitated as the orange-red Bi(tu)_{3}I_{3}•Cu(tu)_{3}I in the presence of Cu^{2+} and I^{−}, and this can also act as a test for bismuth.)

Confirmation test for mercury:

Hg^{2+} + 2 KI (in excess) → HgI_{2} + 2 K^{+}
HgI_{2} + 2 KI → K_{2}[HgI_{4}] (red precipitate dissolves)
2 Hg^{2+} + SnCl_{2} → 2 Hg + SnCl_{4} (white precipitate turns gray)
(Hg^{2+} may otherwise be detected via Cu_{2}HgI_{4} formation, see Hg_{2}^{2+} in 1st group cations.)

=== 3rd analytical group of cations ===
The 3rd analytical group of cations includes ions which form hydroxides that are insoluble even at low concentrations.

Cations in the 3rd group are, among others: Fe^{2+}, Fe^{3+}, Al^{3+}, and Cr^{3+}.

The group is determined by making a solution of the salt in water and adding ammonium chloride and ammonium hydroxide. Ammonium chloride is added to ensure low concentration of hydroxide ions.

The formation of a reddish-brown precipitate indicates Fe^{3+}; a gelatinous white precipitate indicates Al^{3+}; and a green precipitate indicates Cr^{3+} or Fe^{2+}. These last two are distinguished by adding sodium hydroxide in excess to the green precipitate. If the precipitate dissolves, Cr^{3+} is indicated; otherwise, Fe^{2+} is present.

=== 4th analytical group of cations ===
The 4th analytical group of cations includes ions that precipitate as sulfides at pH 9. The reagent used is ammonium sulfide or Na_{2}S 0.1 M added to the ammonia/ammonium chloride solution used to detect group 3 cations. It includes: Zn^{2+}, Ni^{2+}, Co^{2+}, and Mn^{2+}. Zinc will form a white precipitate, nickel and cobalt a black precipitate and manganese a brick/flesh colored precipitate. Dimethylglyoxime can be used to confirm nickel presence, while ammonium thiocyanate in ether will turn blue in the presence of cobalt. This group is sometimes denoted as IIIB since groups III and IV are tested for at the same time, with the addition of sulfide being the only difference.

This includes ions which form sulfides that are insoluble at high concentrations. The reagents used are H_{2}S in the presence of NH_{4}OH. NH_{4}OH is used to increase the concentration of the sulfide ion, by the common ion effect - hydroxide ions from NH_{4}OH combine with H^{+} ions from H_{2}S, which shifts the equilibrium in favor of the ionized form:

H_{2}S $\ce{<=>>}$ 2H^{+} + S^{2−}

NH_{4}OH $\ce{<=>>}$ NH^{+}_{4} + OH^{−}

OH- + H^{+} $\ce{<=>>}$ H_{2}O

They contain Zn^{2+}, Mn^{2+}, Ni^{2+} and Co^{2+}

=== 5th analytical group of cations ===
Ions in 5th analytical group of cations form carbonates that are insoluble in water. The reagent usually used is (NH_{4})_{2}CO_{3} (at around 0.2 M), with a neutral or slightly basic pH. All the cations in the previous groups are separated beforehand, since many of them also form insoluble carbonates.

The most important ions in the 5th group are Ba^{2+}, Ca^{2+}, and Sr^{2+}. After separation, the easiest way to distinguish between these ions is by testing flame colour: barium gives a yellow-green flame, calcium gives brick red, and strontium, crimson red.

=== 6th analytical group of cations ===
Cations which are left after carefully separating previous groups are considered to be in the sixth analytical group. The most important ones are Mg^{2+}, Li^{+}, Na^{+} and K^{+}. All the ions are distinguished by flame color: lithium gives a red flame, sodium gives bright yellow (even in trace amounts), potassium gives violet, and magnesium, colorless (although magnesium metal burns with a bright white flame). Magnesium can also be distinguished from other cations in this group by adding sodium hydroxide to drive the pH to 11 or higher, which selectively precipitates Mg(OH)_{2}.

== Detecting anions ==
=== 1st analytical group of anions ===
The 1st group of anions consist of CO^{2−}_{3}, HCO^{−}_{3}, CH_{3}COO^{−}, S^{2−}, SO^{2−}_{3}, S_{2}O^{2−}_{3} and NO^{−}_{2}. The reagent for Group 1 anions is dilute hydrochloric acid (HCl) or dilute sulfuric acid (H_{2}SO_{4}).

- Carbonates give a brisk effervescence with dilute H_{2}SO_{4} due to the release of CO_{2}, a colorless gas which turns limewater milky due to formation of CaCO_{3} (carbonatation). The milkiness disappears on passing an excess of the gas through the lime water, due to formation of Ca(HCO_{3})_{2}.
- Acetates give the vinegar-like smell of CH_{3}COOH when treated with dilute H_{2}SO_{4} and heated. A blood red colouration is produced upon addition of yellow FeCl_{3}, due to formation of iron(III) acetate.
- Sulfides give the rotten egg smell of H_{2}S when treated with dilute H_{2}SO_{4}. The presence of sulfide is confirmed by adding lead(II) acetate paper, which turns black due to the formation of PbS. Sulfides also turn solutions of red sodium nitroprusside purple.
- Sulfites produce SO_{2} gas, which smells of burning sulfur, when treated with dilute acid. They turn acidified K_{2}Cr_{2}O_{7} from orange to green.
- Thiosulfates produce SO_{2} gas when treated with dilute acid. In addition, they form a cloudy precipitate of sulfur.
- Nitrites give reddish-brown fumes of NO_{2} when treated with dilute H_{2}SO_{4}. These fumes cause a solution of potassium iodide (KI) and starch to turn blue.

=== 2nd analytical group of anions ===
The 2nd group of anions consist of Cl^{−}, Br^{−}, I^{−}, NO^{−}_{3} and C_{2}O^{2−}_{4}. The group reagent for Group 2 anion is concentrated sulfuric acid (H_{2}SO_{4}).

After addition of the acid, chlorides, bromides and iodides will form precipitates with silver nitrate. The precipitates are white, pale yellow, and yellow, respectively. The silver halides formed are completely soluble, partially soluble, or not soluble at all, respectively, in aqueous ammonia solution.

Chlorides are confirmed by the chromyl chloride test. When the salt is heated with K_{2}Cr_{2}O_{7} and concentrated H_{2}SO_{4}, red vapours of chromyl chloride (CrO_{2}Cl_{2}) are produced. Passing this gas through a solution of NaOH produces a yellow solution of Na_{2}CrO_{4}. The acidified solution of Na_{2}CrO_{4} gives a yellow precipitate with the addition of (CH_{3}COO)_{2}Pb.

Bromides and iodides are confirmed by the layer test. A sodium carbonate extract is made from the solution containing bromide or iodide, and CHCl_{3} or CS_{2} is added to the solution, which separates into two layers: an orange colour in the CHCl_{3} or CS_{2} layer indicates the presence of Br^{−}, and a violet colour indicates the presence of I^{−}.

Nitrates give brown fumes with concentrated H_{2}SO_{4} due to formation of NO_{2}. This is intensified upon adding copper turnings. Nitrate ion is confirmed by adding an aqueous solution of the salt to FeSO_{4} and pouring concentrated H_{2}SO_{4} slowly along the sides of the test tube, which produces a brown ring around the walls of the tube, at the junction of the two liquids caused by the formation of Fe(NO)^{2+}.

Upon treatment with concentrated sulfuric acid, oxalates yield colourless CO_{2} and CO gases. These gases burn with a bluish flame and turn lime water milky. Oxalates also decolourise KMnO_{4} and give a white precipitate with CaCl_{2}.

=== 3rd analytical group of anions ===
The 3rd group of anions consist of SO^{2−}_{4}, PO^{3−}_{4} and BO^{3−}_{3}. They react neither with concentrated nor diluted H_{2}SO_{4}.

- Sulfates give a white precipitate of BaSO_{4} with BaCl_{2} which is insoluble in any acid or base.
- Phosphates give a yellow crystalline precipitate upon addition of HNO_{3} and ammonium molybdate and heating the solution.
- Borates give a green flame characteristic of ethyl borate when ignited with concentrated H_{2}SO_{4} and ethanol.

== Modern techniques ==
Qualitative inorganic analysis is now used only as a pedagogical tool. Modern techniques such as atomic absorption spectroscopy, ICP-AES, and ICP-MS are able to quickly detect the presence and concentrations of elements using a very small amount of sample.

== Sodium carbonate test ==
The sodium carbonate test (not to be confused with sodium carbonate extract test) is used to distinguish between some common metal ions, which are precipitated as their respective carbonates. The test can distinguish between copper (Cu), iron (Fe), and calcium (Ca), zinc (Zn) or lead (Pb). Sodium carbonate solution is added to the salt of the metal. A blue precipitate indicates Cu^{2+} ion. A dirty green precipitate indicates Fe^{2+} ion. A yellow-brown precipitate indicates Fe^{3+} ion. A white precipitate indicates Ca^{2+}, Zn^{2+}, or Pb^{2+} ion. The compounds formed are, respectively, basic copper carbonate, iron(II) carbonate, iron(III) oxide, calcium carbonate, zinc carbonate, and lead(II) carbonate. This test is used to precipitate the ion present as almost all carbonates are insoluble. While this test is useful for telling these cations apart, it fails if other ions are present, because most metal carbonates are insoluble and will precipitate. In addition, calcium, zinc, and lead ions all produce white precipitates with carbonate, making it difficult to distinguish between them. Instead of sodium carbonate, sodium hydroxide may be added, this gives nearly the same colours, except that lead and zinc hydroxides are soluble in excess alkali, and can hence be distinguished from calcium. See qualitative inorganic analysis for the complete sequence of tests used for qualitative cation analysis.

== See also ==
- Flame test
- Bead test
