= Bead test =

Test for the presence of certain metals

The bead test is a traditional part of qualitative inorganic analysis to test for the presence of certain metals. The oldest one is the borax bead test or blister test. It was introduced by Berzelius in 1812. Since then other salts were used as fluxing agents, such as sodium carbonate or sodium fluoride. The most important one after borax is microcosmic salt, which is the basis of the microcosmic salt bead test.

== Borax bead ==
A small loop is made in the end of a platinum wire and heated in a Bunsen burner flame until red hot. A stick made of another inert substance such as a magnesia stick (MgO) may also be used. It is then dipped into powdered borax and held in the hottest part of the flame where it swells up as it loses its water of crystallization and then shrinks, forming a colourless, transparent glass-like bead (a mixture of sodium metaborate and boric anhydride).

The bead is allowed to cool and then wetted and dipped into the sample to be tested such that only a tiny amount of the substance adheres to the bead. If too much substance is used, the bead will become dark and opaque. The bead and adhering substance is then heated in the lower, reducing, part of the flame, allowed to cool, and the colour observed. It is then heated in the upper, oxidizing, part of the flame, allowed to cool, and the colour observed again. The color is a result of the formation of metal metaborates.

Characteristic coloured beads are produced with salts of copper, iron, chromium, manganese, cobalt and nickel. After the test, the bead is removed by heating it to fusion point, and plunging it into a vessel of water.

Metal	Oxidizing flame	Reducing flame
Aluminum	colorless (hot and cold), opaque	colorless, opaque
Antimony	colorless, yellow or brown (hot)	gray and opaque
Barium	colorless	
Bismuth	colorless, yellow or brownish (hot)	gray and opaque
Cadmium	colorless	gray and opaque
Calcium	colorless	
Cerium	red (hot)	colorless (hot and cold)
Copper	sky blue (hot and cold), opaque	red, opaque
Iron	yellow (hot and cold), opaque	bottle-green, opaque
Manganese	pink (hot and cold), opaque	colorless, opaque
Cobalt	deep blue (hot and cold), opaque	deep blue, opaque
Nickel	yellow-brown (hot and cold), opaque	grey, opaque
Silver	colourless (hot and cold), opaque	grey, opaque
Vanadium	colourless(hot and cold), opaque	green, opaque
Uranium	yellow-brown (hot and cold), opaque	green, opaque
Chromium	green (hot and cold), opaque	green, opaque
Platinum	colourless(hot and cold), opaque	grey, opaque
Gold	yellow-brown (hot and cold), opaque	grey, opaque
Tin	colourless(hot and cold), opaque	colourless, opaque
Titanium	colourless (hot and cold), opaque	yellow, opaque (hot) violet (cold)
Tungsten	colourless(hot and cold), opaque	brown, opaque
Magnesium	colourless(hot and cold), opaque	colourless, opaque
Molybdenum	colourless(hot and cold), opaque	yellow or brown, opaque
Strontium	colourless(hot and cold), opaque	colourless, opaque
Thorium	colourless(hot and cold), opaque	colourless, opaque
Yttrium	colourless(hot and cold), opaque	colourless, opaque
Neodymium	colourless(hot and cold), opaque	colourless, opaque
Praseodymium	colourless(hot and cold), opaque	colourless, opaque
Silicon	colourless(hot and cold), opaque	colourless, opaque
Germanium	colourless(hot and cold), opaque	colourless, opaque

== See also ==
- Flame test
