= Hennig Brand =

17th-century German alchemist

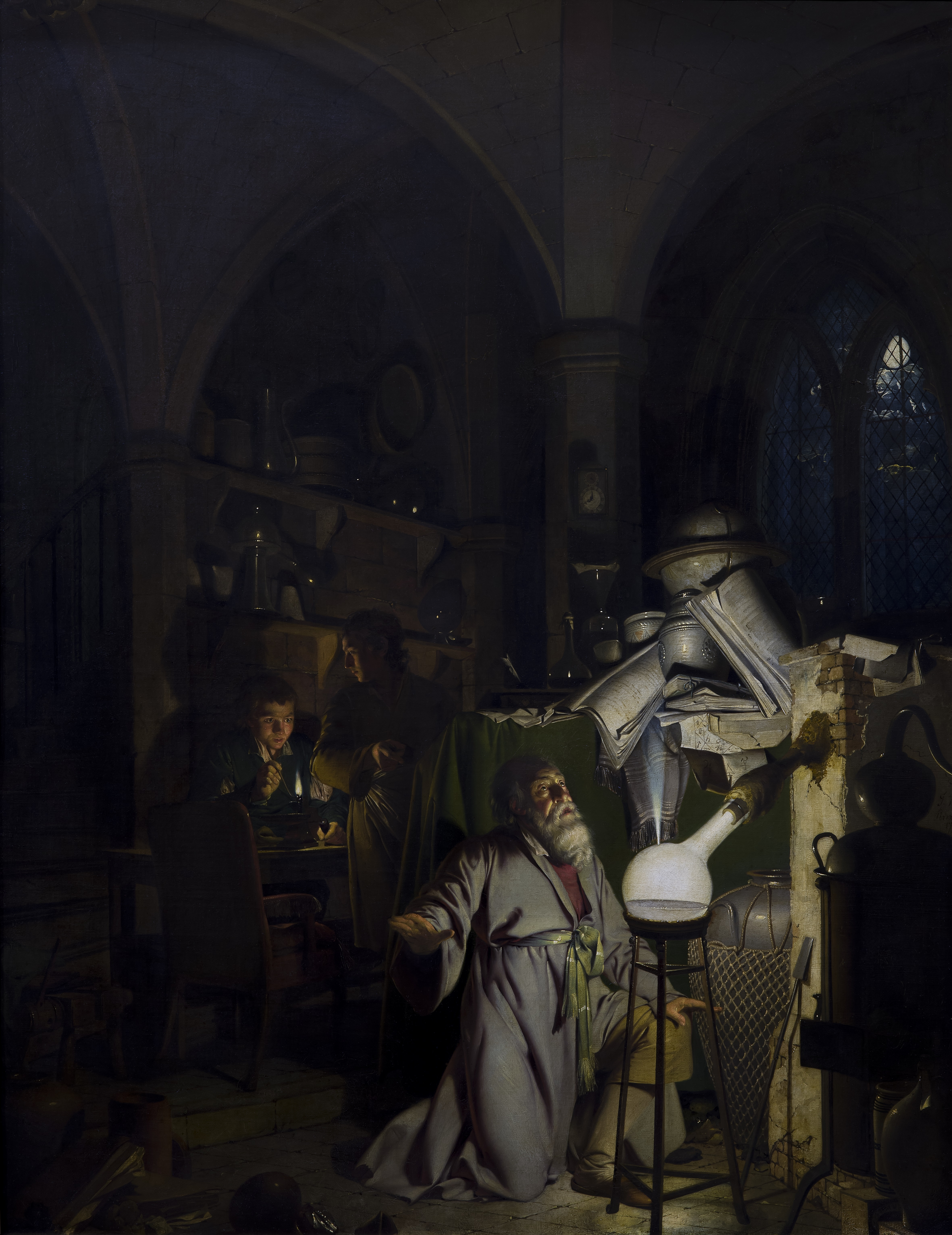
- The Alchemist Discovering Phosphorus (1771) by Joseph Wright depicting Hennig Brand discovering phosphorus (the glow shown is exaggerated)
- Born: about 1630
- Died: about 1692 or about 1710
- Known for: Discovery of the element phosphorus
- Scientific career
- Fields: Alchemy
- Workplaces: Hamburg

Hennig Brand (German pronunciation: [ˈhɛnɪç bʁant]; c. 1630 – c. 1692 or c. 1710) was a German alchemist who lived and worked in Hamburg. In 1669, Brand accidentally discovered the chemical element phosphorus while searching for the "philosopher's stone", a substance which was believed to transmute base metals into gold.

== Biography ==
Brand was born in 1630. Some sources describe his origins as working class and indicate that he had been an apprentice glassmaker as a young man. However, correspondence by his second wife Margaretha states that he was of high social standing. He held a post as a junior army officer during the Thirty Years' War and his first wife's dowry was substantial, allowing him to pursue alchemy on leaving the army. In his later career, he was also employed as a court alchemist in Hanover by Duke Johann Friedrich and corresponded with Gottfried Wilhelm Leibniz.

He was one of the many searchers for the philosopher's stone. In the process, he accidentally discovered phosphorus.

He is thought to have died in either c. 1692 or 1710.

== Discovery of phosphorus ==
Like other alchemists of the time, Brand searched for the "philosopher's stone", a substance which supposedly transformed base metals (like lead) into gold. By the time his first wife died he had exhausted her money on this pursuit. He then married his second wife Margaretha, a wealthy widow whose financial resources allowed him to continue the search.

Like many before him, he was interested in urine and tried combining it with various other materials, in hundreds of combinations. He had seen a recipe in a book 400 Auserlensene Chemische Process, by F. T. Kessler of Strasbourg, published in 1630, for using alum, saltpetre (potassium nitrate) and concentrated urine to turn base metals into silver (a recipe which did not work).

Around 1669 he heated residues from boiled-down urine on his furnace until the retort was red hot, where all of a sudden glowing fumes filled it and liquid dripped out, bursting into flames. He could catch the liquid in a jar and cover it, where it solidified and continued to give off a pale-green glow. What he collected was phosphorus, which he named from the Greek word for "light-bearing" or "light-bearer."

To people of the time phosphorus seemed to glow with a "life force" that did not diminish over time (and did not need re-exposure to light like the previously discovered Bologna Stone). Brand kept his discovery secret, as alchemists of the time did, and worked with the phosphorus trying unsuccessfully to use it to produce gold.

His recipe was:

- Let urine stand for days until it gives off a pungent smell. (This step was not necessary, as later scientists discovered that fresh urine yielded the same amount of phosphorus).
- Boil urine to reduce it to a thick syrup.
- Heat until a red oil distills up from it, and draw that off.
- Allow the remainder to cool, where it consists of a black spongy upper part and a salty lower part.
- Discard the salt, mix the red oil back into the black material.
- Heat that mixture strongly for 16 hours.
- First white fumes come off, then an oil, then phosphorus.
- The phosphorus may be passed into cold water to solidify.

The chemical reaction Brand stumbled on was as follows. Urine contains phosphates PO^{3−}_{4}, as sodium phosphate (with Na^{+}) in the form of microcosmic salt, and various carbon-based organics. Under strong heat the oxygen atoms from the phosphate react with carbon to produce carbon monoxide CO, leaving elemental phosphorus P, which comes off as a gas. Phosphorus condenses to a liquid below about 280 °C and then solidifies (to the white phosphorus allotrope) below about 44 °C (depending on purity). This same essential reaction is still used today (but with mined phosphate ores, coke for carbon, and electric furnaces).

Brand's process yielded far less phosphorus than it could have. The salt part he discarded contained most of the phosphate. He used about 1,500 US gallons (5,700 L) of urine to produce just 120 grams of phosphorus. If he had ground up the entire residue he could have obtained many times more than this (1 litre of adult human urine contains about 1.4 grams of phosphorus salts, which amounts to around 0.11 grams of pure white phosphorus).

Though Brand initially kept his process for producing phosphorus from urine a secret, he later sold the recipe for 200 thalers to a Johann Daniel Kraft from Dresden. Subsequently, both Swedish chemist Johann Kunckel (in 1678) and Irish chemist Robert Boyle (in 1680) were able to independently discover phosphorus; the latter's assistant, Ambrose Godfrey-Hanckwitz, later made a business of manufacturing phosphorus from 1707 onwards.
