= Plutonium(III) phosphate =

Chemical compound

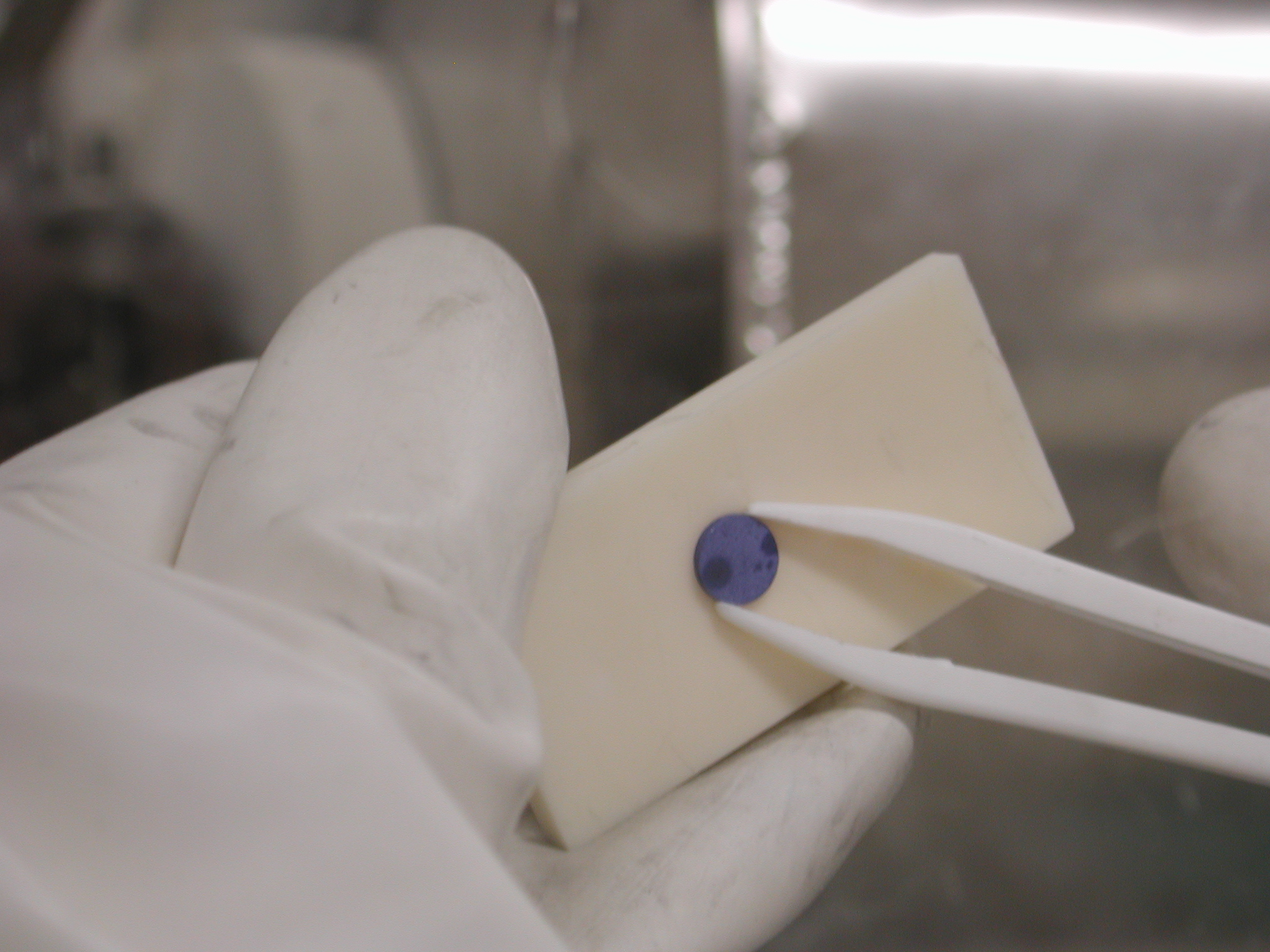
- Plutonium phosphate has a dark violet to green color

Identifiers
CAS Number	35310-25-9
3D model (JSmol)	Interactive image
- InChI: InChI=1S/H3O4P.Pu/c1-5(2,3)4;/h(H3,1,2,3,4);/q;+3/p-3 Key: LTDJAEKVSMMOGC-UHFFFAOYSA-K
- SMILES: [O-]P(=O)([O-])[O-].[Pu+3]

Properties
Chemical formula	PuPO_{4}
Molar mass	339 g·mol^{−1}
Appearance	Dark violet to green depending on hydration and form
Solubility in water	Insoluble

Structure
Crystal structure	Monazite
- Except where otherwise noted, data are given for materials in their standard state (at 25 °C [77 °F], 100 kPa). Infobox references

Plutonium(III) phosphate is an inorganic compound of plutonium, with the molecular formula PuPO_{4}. It is the trivalent plutonium salt of phosphoric acid.

== Preparation ==
Heating a mixture of plutonium dioxide and diammonium phosphate to 1000°C for 12 hours produces polycrystalline plutonium phosphate.

2 PuO_{2} + 2 (NH_{4})_{2}HPO_{4} → 2 PuPO_{4} + 4 NH_{3} + 3 H_{2}O + ^{1}/_{2} O_{2}

Heating the product to 1100°C produces plutonium dioxide and phosphorus pentoxide.

Reacting plutonium(IV) nitrate with disodium phosphate produces PuP_{2}O_{7} which is decomposed to plutonium phosphate when heated to 600°C for 6 hours in an argon/hydrogen atmosphere.

Pu(NO_{3})_{4} + 2 Na_{2}HPO_{4} → PuP_{2}O_{7} + 4 NaNO_{3} + H_{2}O
4 PuP_{2}O_{7} → 4 PuPO_{4} + 2 P_{2}O_{5} + O_{2}
2 PuP_{2}O_{7} + H_{2} → 2 PuPO_{4} + P_{2}O_{5} + H_{2}O

Reacting plutonium(III) fluoride with boron phosphate also produces plutonium phosphate.

PuF_{3} + BPO_{4} → PuPO_{4} + BF_{3}

== Properties ==
Plutonium phosphate crystalizes in the monazite crystal structure.

It does not dissolve in water.
