= Boron phosphate =

Chemical compound

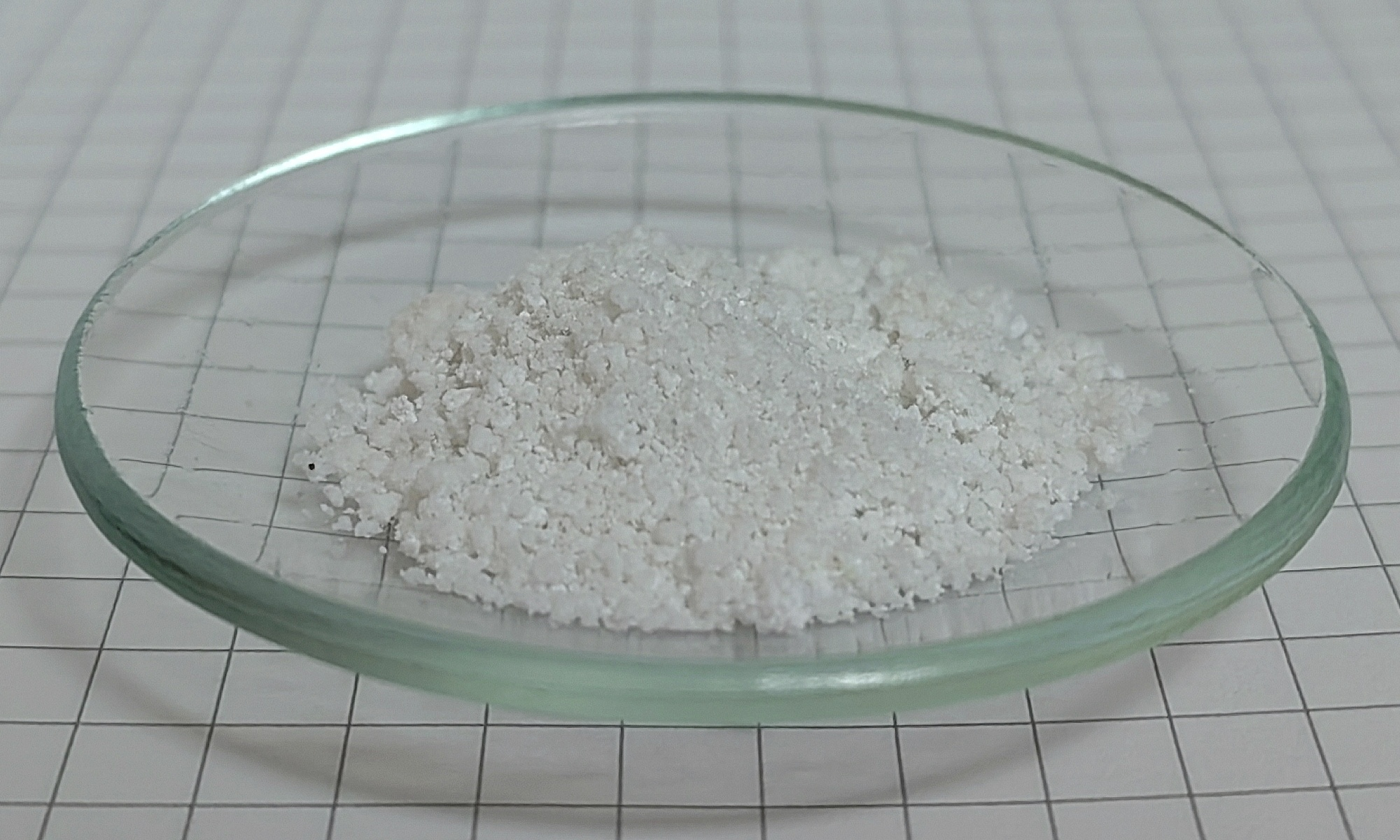

Names
- IUPAC name Boron phosphate
- Systematic IUPAC name 2,4,5-trioxa-1λ^{5}-phospha-3-borabicyclo[1.1.1]pentane 1-oxide

Identifiers
CAS Number	13308-51-5
3D model (JSmol)	Interactive image
ChemSpider	75189
ECHA InfoCard	100.033.020
PubChem CID	83329
CompTox Dashboard (EPA)	DTXSID10872553
- InChI: InChI=1S/B.H3O4P/c;1-5(2,3)4/h;(H3,1,2,3,4)/q+3;/p-3 Key: YZYDPPZYDIRSJT-UHFFFAOYSA-K; InChI=1/B.H3O4P/c;1-5(2,3)4/h;(H3,1,2,3,4)/q+3;/p-3 Key: YZYDPPZYDIRSJT-DFZHHIFOAS
- SMILES: B12OP(=O)(O1)O2

Properties
Chemical formula	BPO_{4}
Molar mass	105.78 g/mol
Density	2.52 g/cm^{3}

Hazards
- GHS labelling
Pictograms	(GHS07: Exclamation mark)
Signal word	Warning
Hazard statements	H302
Precautionary statements	P264, P270, P301+P312, P330, P501
NFPA 704 (fire diamond)	2 0 0
Safety data sheet (SDS)	External SDS
- Except where otherwise noted, data are given for materials in their standard state (at 25 °C [77 °F], 100 kPa). Infobox references

Boron phosphate is an inorganic compound with the chemical formula BPO_{4}. The simplest way of producing it is the reaction of phosphoric acid and boric acid. It is a white infusible solid that evaporates above 1450 °C.

== Synthesis ==
Boron phosphate is synthesized from phosphoric acid and boric acid at a temperature range from 80 °C to 1200 °C. The relatively cold treatment produces a white amorphous powder, which is converted to a microcrystalline product when heated at about 1000 °C for 2 hours.

The main reaction of the process is:

H_{3}BO_{3} + H_{3}PO_{4} → BPO_{4} + 3 H_{2}O

New ways of synthesizing the compound have also been reported, such as hydrothermal and microwave synthesis.

Due to the particular industrial interest of boron phosphate, other methods are used as well:

- Phosphoric acid and triethyl borate
- Triethyl phosphate and boron trichloride
- Diammonium phosphate acid and borax heated to 1000 °C
- Boric acid and phosphorus pentoxide (hydrothermal)

== Structure ==
If obtained at pressure, the ordinary structure is isomorphous with the β-cristobalite, while subjecting it to high pressure is obtained a compound isomorphic with α-quartz. The structure of AlPO_{4}, berlinite, is isomorphous with α-quartz.

== Applications ==
It is used as a catalyst for dehydration and other reactions in organic synthesis. Also, it serves as a source of phosphates for exchange reactions in the solid state to obtain metal phosphates.
