= Stercorite =

Phosphate mineral

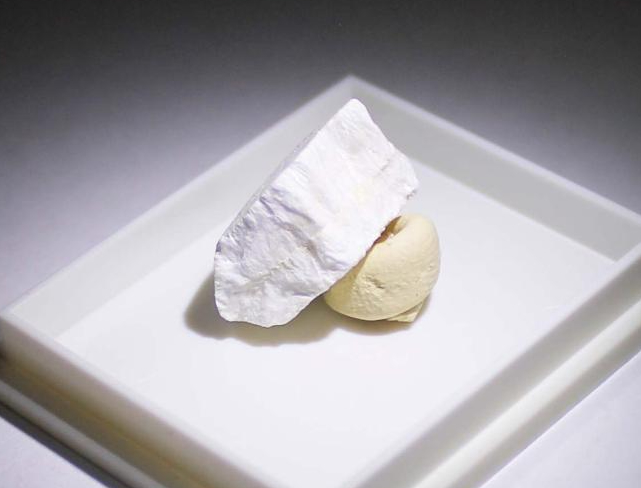

General
- Category: Phosphate minerals
- Formula: (NH_{4})NaHPO_{4}
- IMA symbol: Stc
- Strunz classification: 8.CJ.05
- Crystal system: Triclinic
- Crystal class: Pinacoidal (1̅) (same H-M symbol)
- Space group: P1̅

Identification
- Formula mass: 137.0077 g/mol
- Mohs scale hardness: 2
- Luster: Vitreous
- Diaphaneity: Transparent
- Density: 1.615 g/cm^{3}
- Melting point: 79 °C (174 °F)
- Fusibility: Fusible
- Solubility: Water soluble

Stercorite is the mineral form of microcosmic salt. The name comes from the Latin "stercus", meaning dung, since the mineral was originally discovered among guano.
