= Oxidizing and reducing flames =

States of a flame

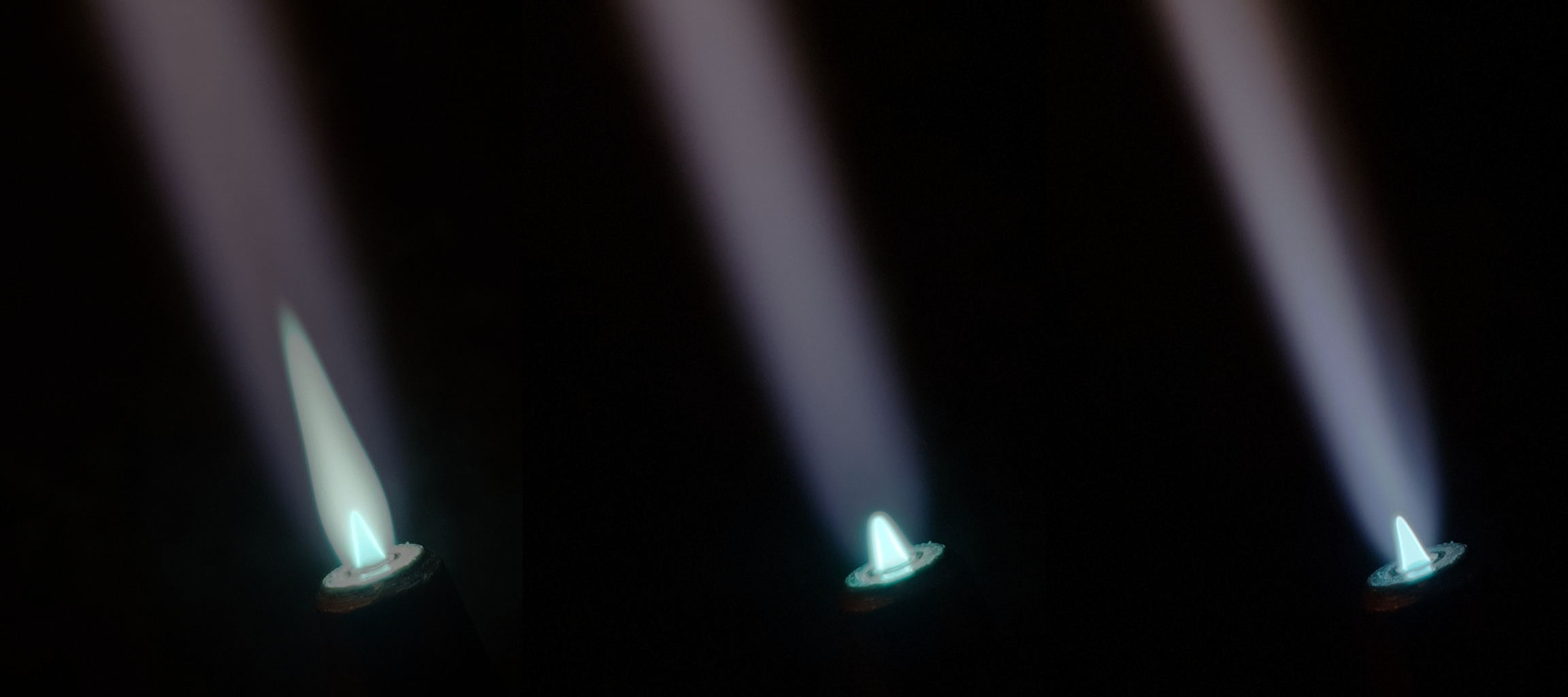
Reducing, neutral, and oxidizing oxyacetylene flames

A flame is affected by the fuel introduced and the oxygen available. A flame with a balanced oxygen-fuel ratio is called a neutral flame. The color of a neutral flame is semi-transparent purple or blue. This flame is optimal for many uses because it does not oxidize or deposit soot onto surfaces.

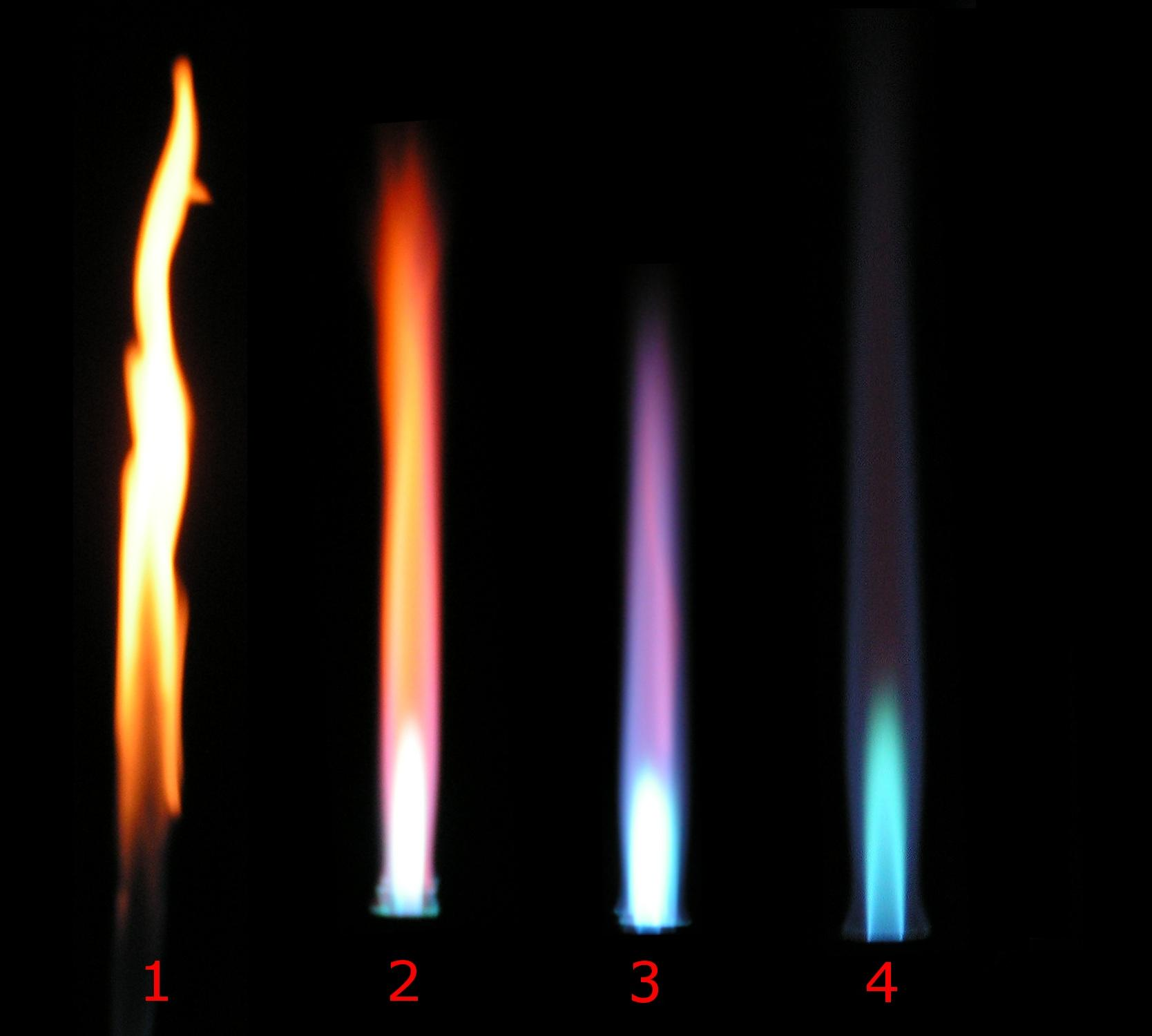
Bunsen burner flames with different oxygen levels: 1. diffusion flame, 2. reducing flame, 3. fuel-rich neutral flame, 4. neutral flame

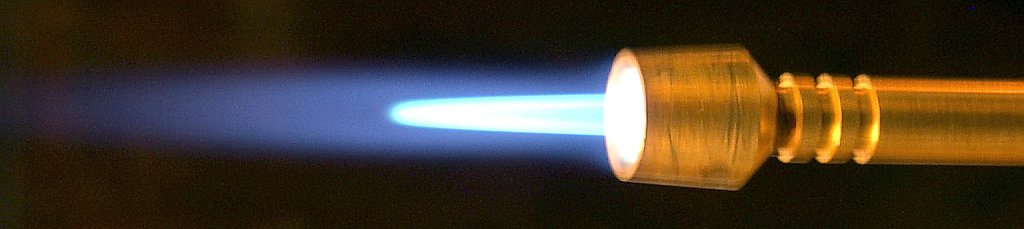
Oxygen rich butane torch flame

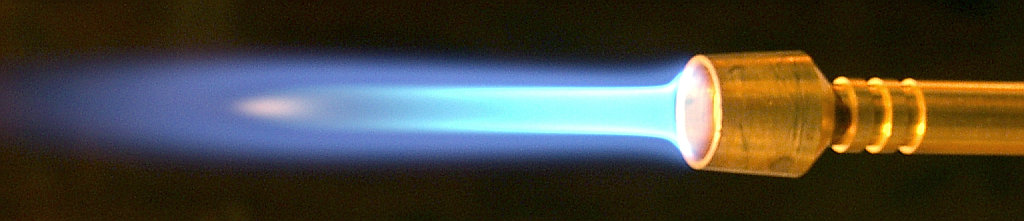
Fuel rich butane torch flame

== Oxidizing flame ==
If the flame has more than enough oxygen, an oxidizing flame is produced. When the amount of oxygen increases, the flame shortens due to quicker combustion, its color becomes a more transparent blue, and it hisses or roars. With some exceptions (e.g., platinum soldering in jewelry), the oxidizing flame is usually undesirable for welding and soldering, since, as its name suggests, it oxidizes the metal's surface. The same principle is important in firing pottery.

== Reducing flame ==
A reducing flame is a flame with insufficient oxygen. It has an opaque yellow or orange color due to incandescent carbon or hydrocarbons which bind with (or reduce) the oxygen contained in the materials the flame processes. The flame is also called carburizing flame, since it tends to introduce carbon soot into the molten metal.

The flame also produces carbon monoxide, a poisonous gas which burns on the outer envelope of flame into carbon dioxide.

=== Reducing flames with no carbon ===
Reducing flames using zero-carbon fuel, such as reducing hydrogen flames, are exceptions. They do not have an opaque yellow or orange glow, nor do they produce soot or carbon monoxide.

== See also ==
- Oxy–fuel welding and cutting § Types of flame for further details about the above types of flame in oxy-fuel burners
- Flame test
- Oxygen
- Oxyhydrogen
- Redox
- Spark testing
