= Triethyl borate =

Chemical compound

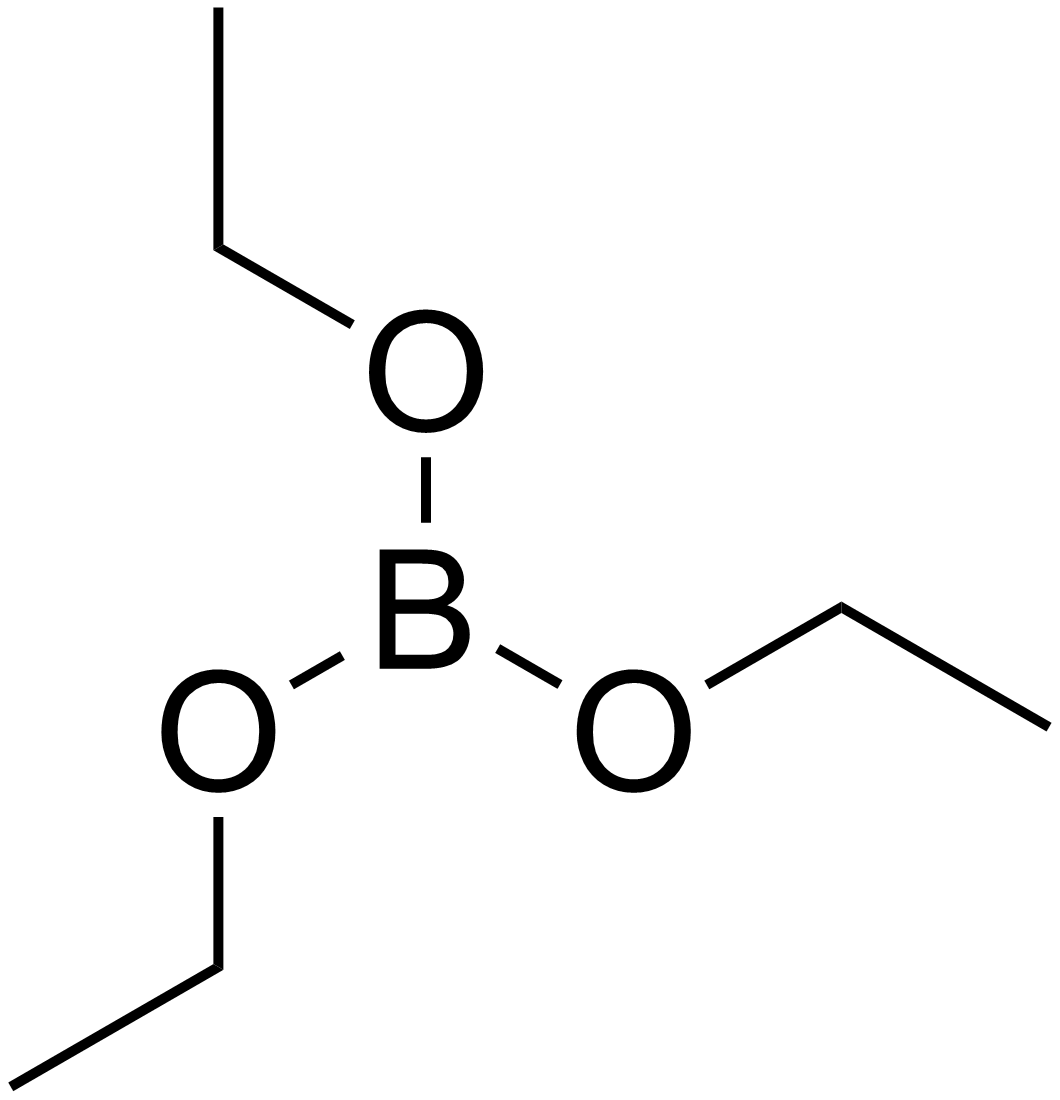

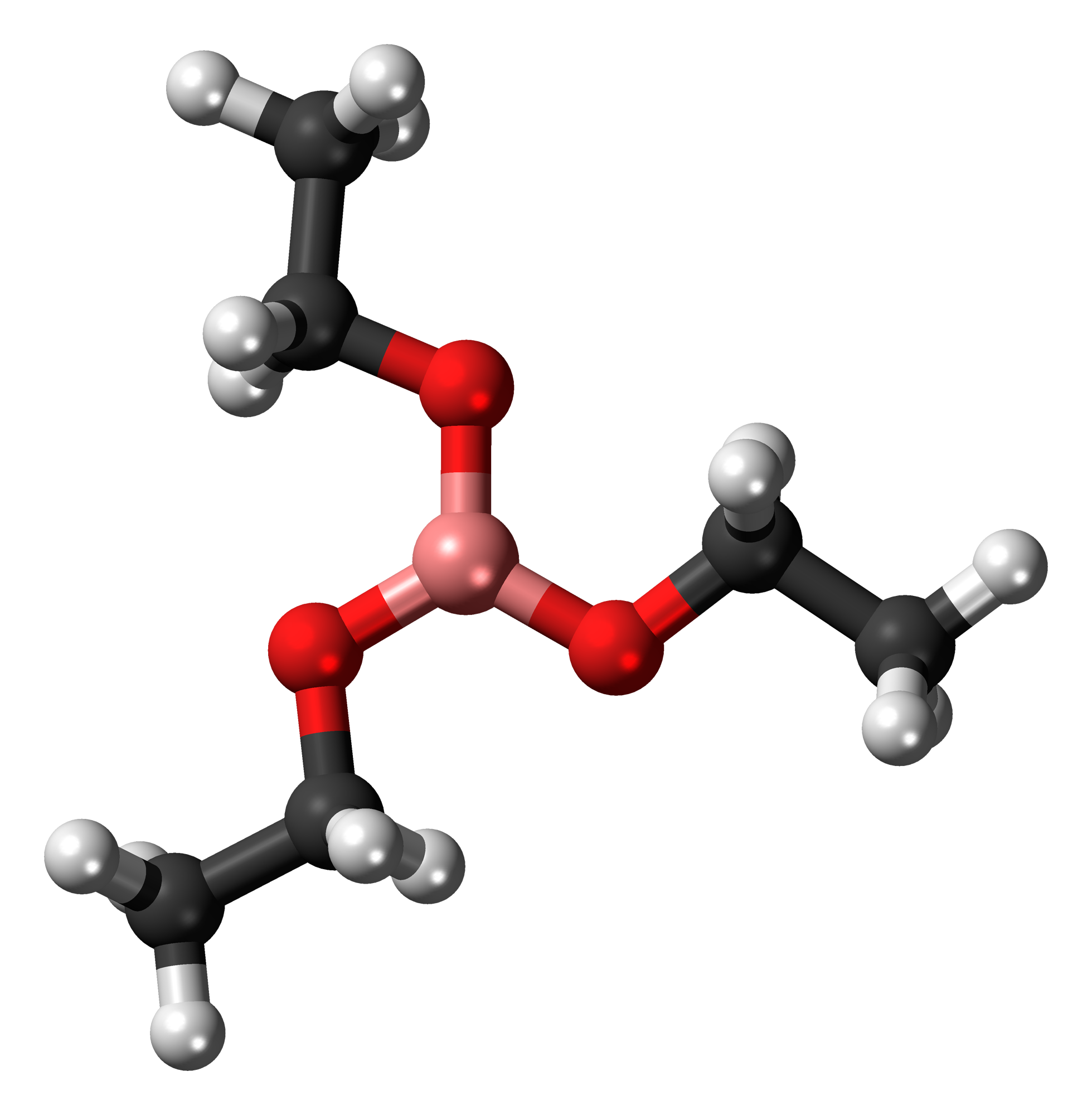

Names
- IUPAC name Triethyl borate
- Other names Boron triethoxide Boric acid, triethyl ester

Identifiers
CAS Number	150-46-9
3D model (JSmol)	Interactive image
ChEBI	CHEBI:38916
ChemSpider	8659
ECHA InfoCard	100.005.238
EC Number	205-760-9
PubChem CID	9009
UNII	WXW2J80ORX
CompTox Dashboard (EPA)	DTXSID2041674
- InChI: InChI=1S/C6H15BO3/c1-4-8-7(9-5-2)10-6-3/h4-6H2,1-3H3 Key: AJSTXXYNEIHPMD-UHFFFAOYSA-N; InChI=1/C6H15BO3/c1-4-8-7(9-5-2)10-6-3/h4-6H2,1-3H3 Key: AJSTXXYNEIHPMD-UHFFFAOYAB
- SMILES: O(B(OCC)OCC)CC

Properties
Chemical formula	C_{6}H_{15}BO_{3}
Molar mass	145.99 g·mol^{−1}
Appearance	clear liquid
Density	0.858 g/cm^{3}
Melting point	−85 °C (−121 °F; 188 K)
Boiling point	118 °C (244 °F; 391 K)

Hazards
Flash point	11 °C (52 °F; 284 K)
- Except where otherwise noted, data are given for materials in their standard state (at 25 °C [77 °F], 100 kPa). verify (what is ?) Infobox references

Triethyl borate is a colorless liquid with the formula B(OCH_{2}CH_{3})_{3}. It is an ester of boric acid and ethanol. It has few applications.

It is a weak Lewis acid (AN = 17 as measured by the Gutmann–Beckett method). It burns with a green flame and solutions of it in ethanol are therefore used in special effects and pyrotechnics.

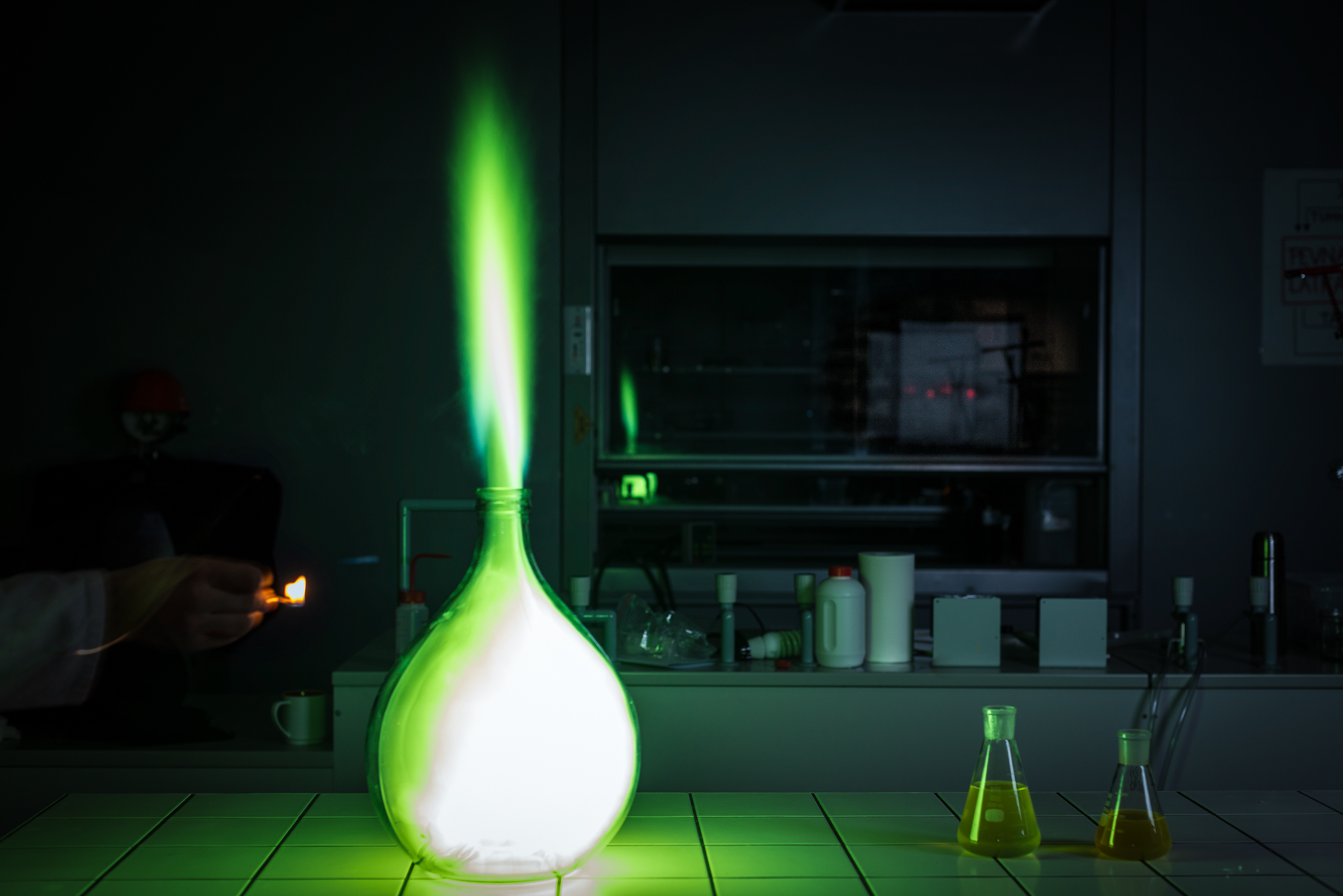
Green flame of triethyl borate

Video of triethyl borate burning (with intermittent blowing on it)

It is formed by the reaction of boric acid and ethanol in the presence of acid catalyst, where it forms according to the equilibrium reaction:

B(OH)_{3} + 3 C_{2}H_{5}OH ⇌ (C_{2}H_{5}O)_{3}B + 3 H_{2}O

In order to increase the rate of forward reaction, the formed water must be removed from reaction media by either azeotropic distillation or adsorption. It is used as a solvent and/or catalyst in preparation of synthetic waxes, resins, paints, and varnishes. It is used as a component of some flame retardants in textile industry and of some welding fluxes.
