= Flame test =

Process in chemistry to detect certain elements

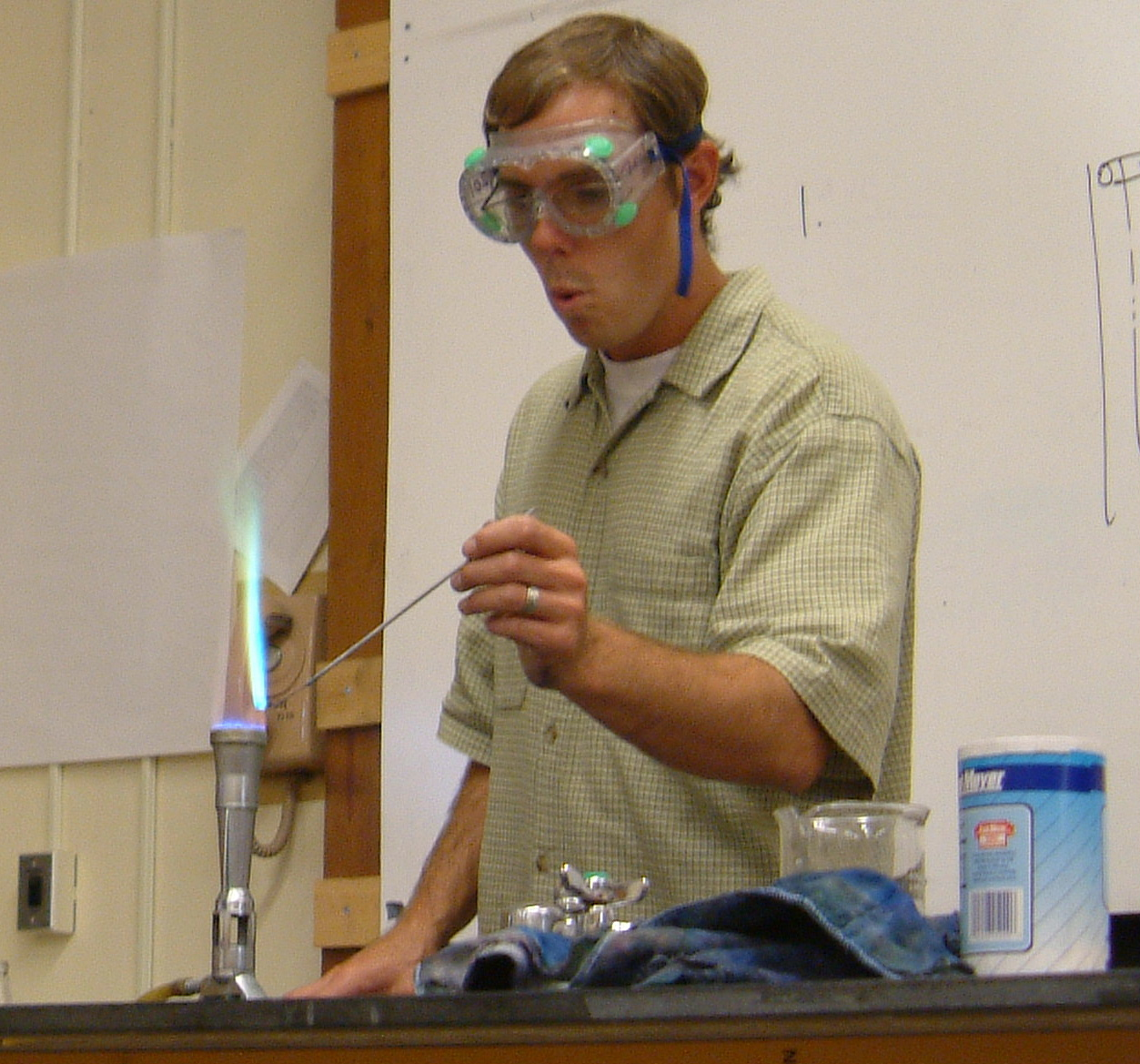
The flame test carried out on a copper halide. The characteristic bluish-green color of the flame is due to the copper.

A flame test is a relatively quick test for the presence of some elements in a sample. The technique is archaic and of questionable reliability, but once was a component of qualitative inorganic analysis. The phenomenon is related to pyrotechnics and atomic emission spectroscopy. The color of the flames is understood through the principles of atomic electron transition and photoemission, where varying elements require distinct energy levels (photons) for electron transitions.

== History ==
Robert Bunsen invented the now-famous Bunsen burner in 1855, which was useful in flame tests due to its non-luminous flame that did not disrupt the colors emitted by the test materials. The Bunsen burner, combined with a prism (filtering the color interference of contaminants), led to the creation of the spectroscope, capable of emitting the spectral emission of various elements. In 1860, the unexpected appearance of sky-blue and dark red was observed in spectral emissions by Bunsen and Gustav Kirchhoff, leading to the discovery of two alkali metals, caesium (sky blue) and rubidium (dark red). Today, this low-cost method is used in secondary education to teach students to detect metals in samples qualitatively.

== Process ==
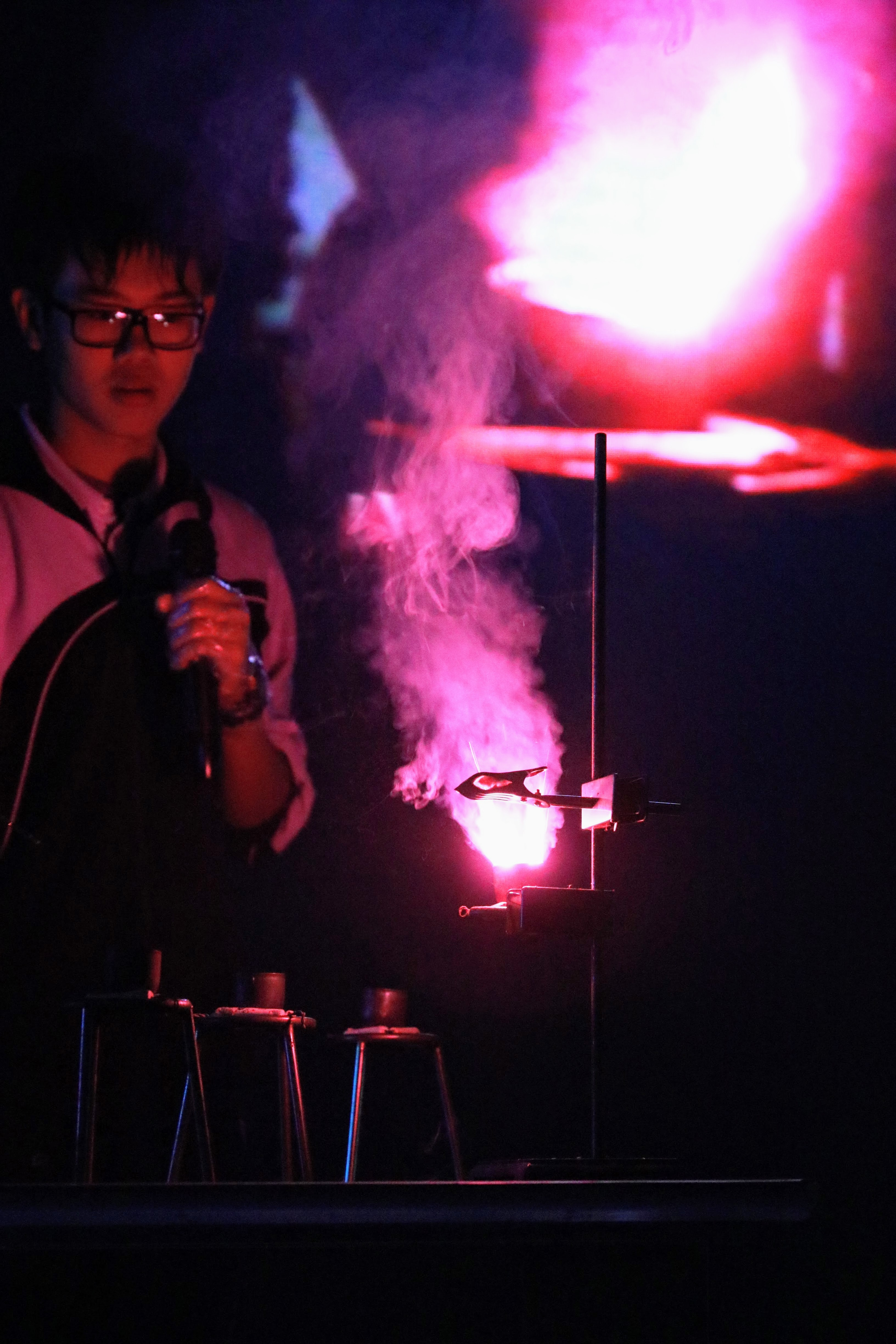
A flame test showing the presence of lithium

Flame test of a few metal ions

A flame test involves introducing a sample of the element or compound to a hot, non-luminous flame and observing the color of the flame that results. The compound can be made into a paste with concentrated hydrochloric acid, as metal halides, being volatile, give better results. Different flames can be tried to verify the accuracy of the color. Wooden splints, Nichrome wires, platinum wires, magnesia rods, cotton swabs, and melamine foam are suggested for support. Safety precautions are crucial due to the flammability and toxicity of some substances involved. When using a splint, one must be careful to wave the splint through the flame rather than holding it in the flame for extended periods, to avoid setting the splint itself on fire. The use of a cotton swab or melamine foam (used in "eraser" cleaning sponges) as a support has also been suggested. Sodium is a common component or contaminant in many samples, and its spectrum tends to dominate many other flame tests. The test flame is often viewed through cobalt blue glass to filter out the yellow of sodium and allow for easier viewing of other metal ions.

The color of the flames also generally depends on temperature and oxygen fed; see flame colors. The procedure uses different solvents and flames to view the test flame through a cobalt blue glass or didymium glass to filter the interfering light of contaminants such as sodium.

Flame tests are subject of a number of limitations. The range of elements positively detectable under standard conditions is small. Some elements emit weakly and others (Na) very strongly. Gold, silver, platinum, palladium, and a number of other elements do not produce a characteristic flame color, although some may produce sparks (as do metallic titanium and iron); salts of beryllium and gold reportedly deposit pure metal on cooling. The test is highly subjective.

== Principle ==
Electron excitation

In flame tests, ions are excited thermally. These excited states then relax to the ground state with emission of a photon. The energy of the excited state(s) and associated emitted photon is characteristic of the element. The nature of the excited and ground states depends only on the element. Ordinarily, there are no bonds to be broken, and molecular orbital theory is not applicable. The emission spectrum observed in flame test is also the basis of flame emission spectroscopy, atomic emission spectroscopy, and flame photometry.

== Common elements ==
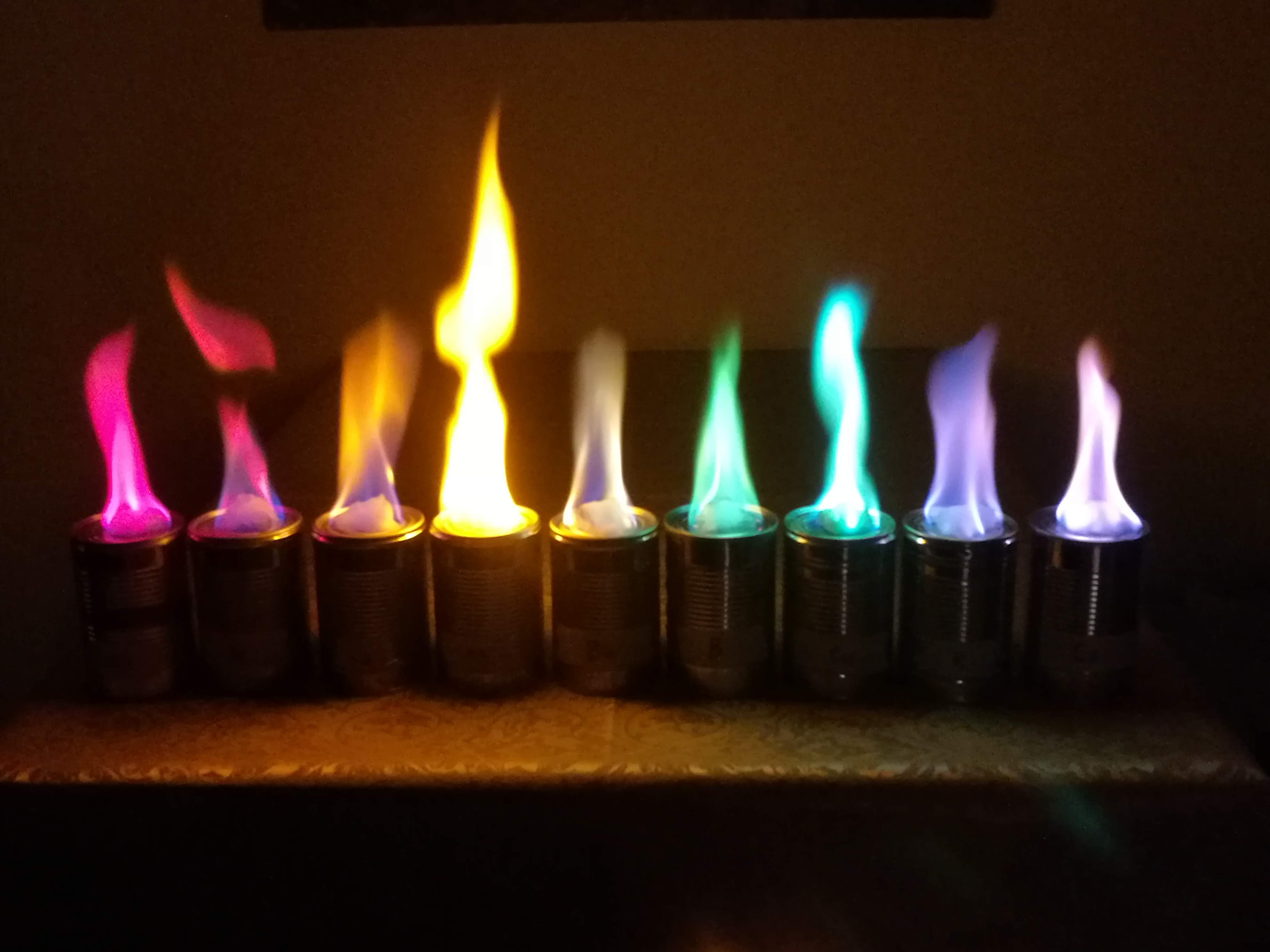
Coloured flames of methanol solutions of different compounds, burning on cotton wool. From left to right: lithium chloride, strontium chloride, calcium chloride, sodium chloride, barium chloride, trimethyl borate, copper chloride, cesium chloride and potassium chloride.

Some common elements and their corresponding colors are:

Symbol	Name	Color	Image
Al	Aluminium	Silver-white, in very high temperatures such as an electric arc, light blue	
As	Arsenic	Blue	
B	Boron	Bright green	
Ba	Barium	Light apple green	Flame resulting from Barium Chloride combustion in a Bunsen burner
Be	Beryllium	White	
Bi	Bismuth	Azure blue	
Ca	Calcium	Brick/orange red; light green as seen through blue glass.	
Cd	Cadmium	Brick red	
Ce	Cerium	Yellow	
Co	Cobalt	Silvery white	
Cr	Chromium	Silvery white	
Cs	Caesium	Blue-violet	
Cu(I)	Copper(I)	Blue-green	
Cu(II)	Copper(II) (non-halide)	Green	Flame test on copper sulfate
Cu(II)	Copper(II) (halide)	Blue-green	
Fe(II)	Iron(II)	Gold, when very hot such as an electric arc, bright blue, or green turning to orange-brown	
Fe(III)	Iron(III)	Orange-brown	An iron (III) flame, generated using the thermite reaction
Ge	Germanium	Pale blue	
H	Hydrogen	Pale blue	
Hf	Hafnium	White	
Hg	Mercury	Red	
In	Indium	Indigo blue	
K	Potassium	Lilac invisible through cobalt blue glass (purple)	
Li	Lithium	Carmine red; invisible through green glass	
Mg	Magnesium	Colorless due to magnesium oxide layer, but burning Mg metal gives an intense white	
Mn(II)	Manganese(II)	Yellowish green	
Mo	Molybdenum	Yellowish green	
Na	Sodium	Bright yellow; Golden; invisible through cobalt blue glass. See also Sodium-vapor lamp	
Nb	Niobium	Green or blue	
Ni	Nickel	Colorless to silver-white	
P	Phosphorus	Pale blue-green	
Pb	Lead	Blue-white	
Ra	Radium	Crimson red	
Rb	Rubidium	Violet red	
S	Sulfur	Blue	
Sb	Antimony	Pale green	
Sc	Scandium	Orange	
Se	Selenium	Azure blue	
Sn	Tin	Blue-white	
Sr	Strontium	Crimson to scarlet red	
Ta	Tantalum	Blue	
Te	Tellurium	Pale green	
Ti	Titanium	Silver-white	
Tl	Thallium	Pure green	
V	Vanadium	Yellowish green	
W	Tungsten	Green	
Y	Yttrium	Carmine, crimson, or scarlet red	
Zn	Zinc	Colorless to blue-green	
Zr	Zirconium	Mild/dull red	

== See also ==
- Bead test
- Spark testing
- Colored fire
- Electron excitation
- Emission spectrum
- Inductively coupled plasma atomic emission spectroscopy
