= Sodium borate =

Sodium borate is a generic name for any salt of sodium with an anion consisting of boron and oxygen, and possibly hydrogen, or any hydrate thereof. It can be seen as a hydrated sodium salt of the appropriate boroxy acid, although the latter may not be a stable compound.

Many sodium borates have important industrial and household applications; the best known being borax, (Na^{+})_{2}[B_{4}O_{5}(OH)_{4}]^{2−}·8H_{2}O = Na_{2}B_{4}H_{20}O_{17}.

The ternary phase diagram of the Na_{2}O–B_{2}O_{3}–H_{2}O phase diagram in the 0–100 °C temperature range contains 13 unique hydrated crystalline sodium borates, including five important industrial products.

Sodium borates, as well as boroxy acids, are often described as mixtures xNa_{2}O·yB_{2}O_{3}·zH_{2}O = Na_{2x}B_{2y}H_{2z}O_{x+3y+z}, with x, y, and z chosen to fit the elemental formula, or a multiple thereof. Thus, for example, borax Na_{2}B_{4}H_{20}O_{17} would be 1Na_{2}O·2B_{2}O_{3}·10H_{2}O, and boric acid B(OH)_{3} would be 0Na_{2}O·1B_{2}O_{3}·1H_{2}O = 2[B(OH)_{3}].

The elemental formula was often interpreted as a z-hydrate of an "anhydrous" salt without any hydrogen, namely Na_{2x}B_{2y}O_{3y}·zH_{2}O. However, later research uncovered that many borates have hydroxyl groups HO^{−} bound covalently to the boron atoms in the anion. Thus borax, for example, is still often described as a decahydrate Na_{2}B_{4}O_{7}·10H_{2}O, with the implied anion [B_{4}O_{7}]^{2−}, whereas the correct formula is Na_{2}B_{4}O_{5}(OH)_{4}·8H_{2}O, with anion [B_{4}O_{5}(OH)_{4}]^{2−}.

The following table gives some of the crystalline sodium borates in this family. The column x/(x+y) is the formal mole fraction of Na_{2}O in the "anhydrous" version.

x:y:z	x/(x+y)	Elemental formula	As hydrate	Correct formula	Name
3:1:0	0.750	Na_{6}B_{2}O_{6} = Na_{3}BO_{3}		Na_{3}BO_{3}	trisodium orthoborate (anhydrous)
1:1:0	0.500	Na_{2}B_{2}O_{4} = NaBO_{2}		Na_{3}B_{3}O_{6}	sodium metaborate
1:1:1	0.500	Na_{2}H_{2}B_{2}O_{5}	Na_{2}B_{2}O_{4}·H_{2}O	?	?
1:1:4	0.500	Na_{2}H_{8}B_{2}O_{8} = NaBH_{4}O_{4}	NaBO_{2}·2H_{2}O	NaB(OH)_{4}	sodium tetrahydroxyborate
1:1:8	0.500	Na_{2}H_{16}B_{2}O_{12} = NaBH_{8}O_{6}	NaBO_{2}·4H_{2}O	?	?
1:2:0	0.333	Na_{2}B_{4}O_{7}		Na_{2}B_{4}O_{7}	borax (anhydrous)
1:2:4	0.333	Na_{2}H_{8}B_{4}O_{11}	Na_{2}B_{4}O_{7}·4H_{2}O	Na_{2}B_{4}O_{5}(OH)_{4}	borax "tetrahydrate"
1:2:5	0.333	Na_{2}H_{10}B_{4}O_{12} = NaB_{2}H_{5}O_{6}	Na_{2}B_{4}O_{7}·5H_{2}O	Na_{2}B_{4}O_{5}(OH)_{4}·H_{2}O	borax "pentahydrate"
1:2:10	0.333	Na_{2}H_{20}B_{4}O_{17}	Na_{2}B_{4}O_{7}·10H_{2}O	Na_{2}B_{4}O_{5}(OH)_{4}·8H_{2}O	borax "decahydrate"
1:3:0	0.250	Na_{2}B_{6}O_{10} = NaB_{3}O_{5}		NaB_{3}O_{5}	?
1:4:0	0.200	Na_{2}B_{8}O_{13}		Na_{2}B_{8}O_{13}	disodium octaborate (anhydrous)
2:9:11	0.182	Na_{4}H_{22}B_{18}O_{31}	Na_{4}B_{18}O_{29}·11H_{2}O	Na_{2}[B_{8}O_{11}(OH)_{4}]·[B(OH)_{3}]·2H_{2}O	disodium enneaborate
1:5:2	0.167	Na_{2}H_{4}B_{10}O_{18} = NaH_{2}B_{5}O_{9}	NaB_{5}O_{8}·H_{2}O	?	sodium pentaborate "monohydrate"
1:5:4	0.167	Na_{2}H_{8}B_{10}O_{20} = NaH_{4}B_{5}O_{10}	NaB_{5}O_{8}·2H_{2}O	Na[B_{5}O_{7}(OH)_{2}]·H_{2}O	sodium pentaborate "dihydrate"
1:5:10	0.167	Na_{2}H_{20}B_{10}O_{26} = NaH_{10}B_{5}O_{13}	NaB_{5}O_{8}·5H_{2}O	?	sodium pentaborate "pentahydrate"
3:5:4	0.125	Na_{6}H_{8}B_{10}O_{22} = Na_{3}H_{4}B_{5}O_{11}	Na_{3}B_{5}O_{7}·2H_{2}O	Na_{3}B_{5}O_{8}(OH)_{2}·H_{2}O	trisodium pentaborate

Some of the borates above may have more than one isomeric or crystalline form. Some may decompose when dissolved in water. Note that the anion of the "anhydrous borax" is different from that of its "hydrates".

Some of the anhydrous borates above can be crystallized from molten mixtured of sodium oxide and boric oxide.

Some sodium borates hower cannot be analyzed as combinations xNa_{2}O·yB_{2}O_{3}·zH_{2}O of the three ordinary oxides. The most important example is sodium perborate, originally described as NaBO_{3}·H_{2}O but actually (Na^{+})_{2}[B_{2}O_{4}(OH)_{4}]^{2−}. The anion of this compound has two peroxide bridges −O−O− which make it oxygen-rich compared to the general family above.
