= Borate =

Boron-oxygen anion or functional group

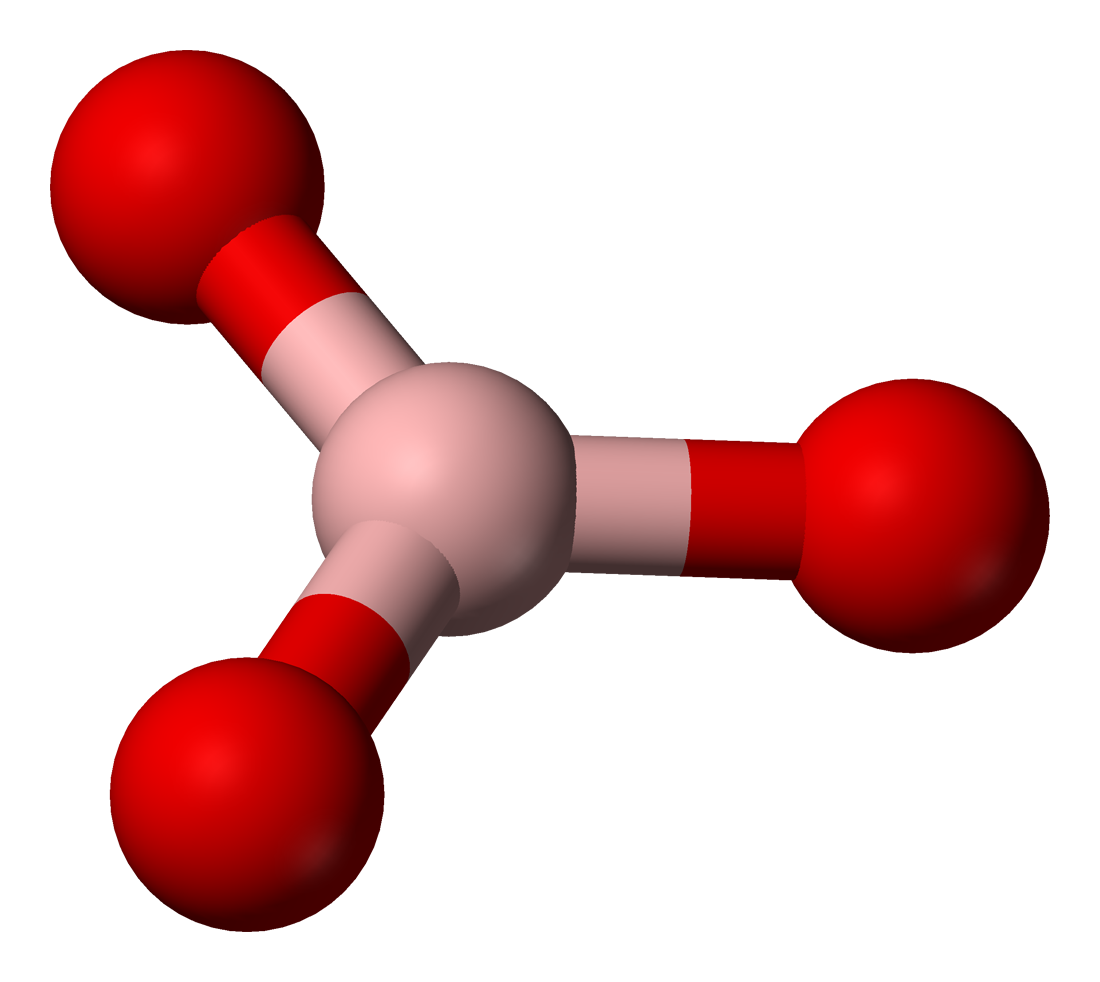
The orthoborate anion, a simple borate anion

A borate is any of a range of boron oxyanions, anions containing boron and oxygen, such as orthoborate BO^{3−}_{3}, metaborate BO^{−}_{2}, or tetraborate B_{4}O^{2−}_{7}; or any salt of such anions, such as sodium metaborate, Na^{+}[BO_{2}]^{−} and borax (Na^{+})_{2}[B_{4}O_{7}]^{2−}. The name also refers to esters of such anions, such as trimethyl borate B(OCH_{3})_{3}.

== Natural occurrence ==
Borate ions occur, alone or with other anions, in many borate and borosilicate minerals such as borax, boracite, ulexite (boronatrocalcite) and colemanite. Borates also occur in seawater, contributing to the absorption of low-frequency sound in seawater.

Common borate salts include sodium metaborate (NaBO_{2}) and borax. Borax is soluble in water, so mineral deposits only occur in places with very low rainfall. Extensive deposits were found in Death Valley and shipped with twenty-mule teams from 1883 to 1889. In 1925, deposits were found at Boron, California on the edge of the Mojave Desert. The Atacama Desert in Chile also contains mineable borate concentrations.

Borates also occur in plants, including almost all fruits.

== Anions ==
The main borate anions are:

- tetrahydroxyborate [B(OH)_{4}]^{−}, found in sodium tetrahydroxyborate Na[B(OH)_{4}].
- orthoborate [BO_{3}]^{3−}, found in trisodium orthoborate Na_{3}[BO_{3}]
- [BO_{4}]^{5−}, found in the calcium yttrium borosilicate oxyapatite Ca_{3}Y_{7}BO_{4}(SiO_{4})_{5}O
- perborate [B_{2}O_{4}(OH)_{4}]^{2−}, as in sodium perborate Na_{2}[H_{4}B_{2}O_{8}]
- metaborate [BO_{2}]^{−} or its cyclic trimer [B_{3}O_{6}]^{3−}, found in sodium metaborate Na_{3}[B_{3}O_{6}]
- diborate [B_{2}O_{5}]^{4−}, found in magnesium diborate (suanite) Mg_{2}[B_{2}O_{5}] ,
- triborate [B_{3}O_{7}]^{5−}, found in calcium aluminium triborate (johachidolite) Ca[AlB_{3}O_{7}] ,
- tetraborate [B_{4}O_{7}]^{2−}, found in anhydrous borax Na_{2}[B_{4}O_{7}]
- tetrahydroxytetraborate [B_{4}O_{5}(OH)_{4}]^{2−}, found in borax "decahydrate" Na_{2}[B_{4}O_{5}(OH)_{4}]·8H_{2}O
- tetraborate(6-) [B_{4}O_{9}]^{6−}, found in lithium tetraborate(6-) Li_{6}[B_{4}O_{9}]
- pentaborate [B_{5}O_{8}]^{−} or [B_{10}O_{16}]^{2−}, found in sodium pentaborate Na_{2}[B_{10}O_{16}]·10H_{2}O
- octaborate [B_{8}O_{13}]^{2−}, found in disodium octaborate Na_{2}[B_{8}O_{13}]
Borate ions
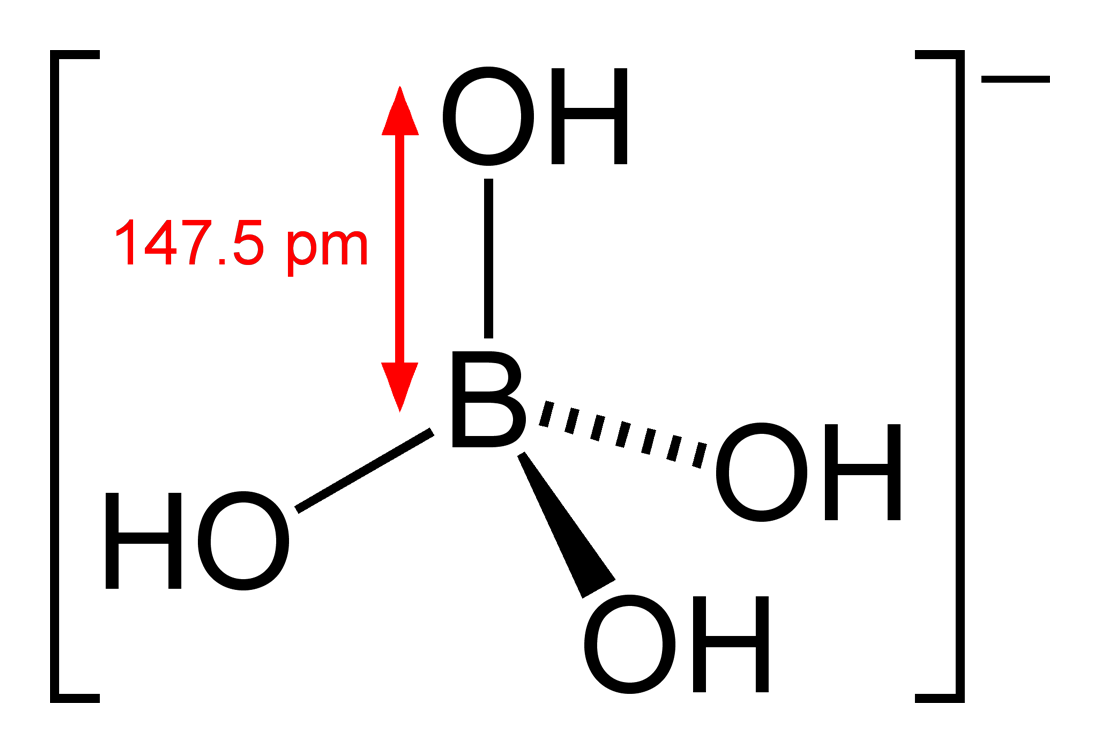
The structure of the tetrahydroxyborate ion ([B(OH)_{4}]^{−}). This anion has a tetrahedral molecular geometry at the boron atom.

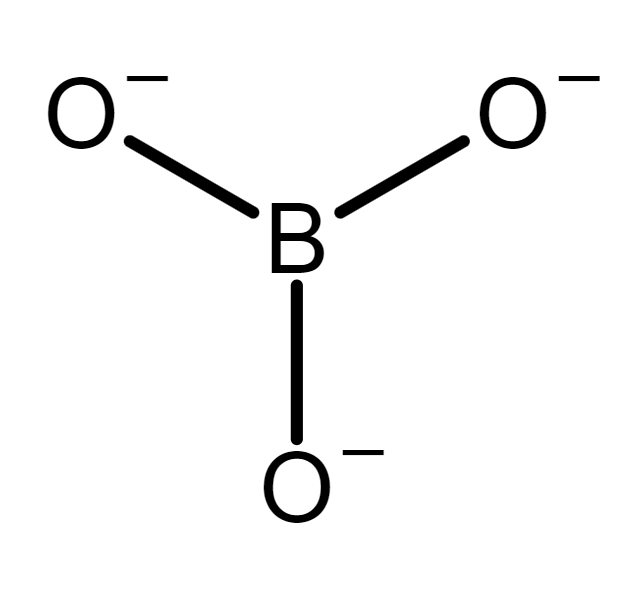
The structure of the orthoborate ion ([BO_{3}]^{3−}). This anion has a trigonal planar molecular geometry.

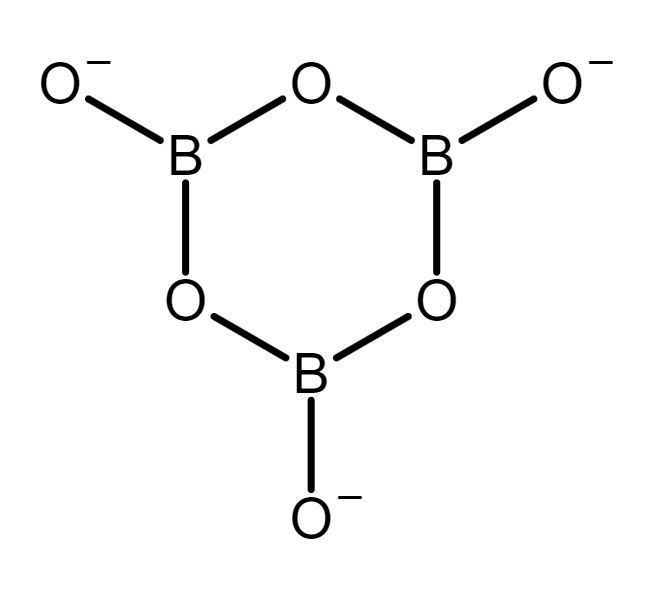
The structure of the trimer of the metaborate ion ([B_{3}O_{6}]^{3−}). This anion is a cyclic molecule and has a trigonal planar molecular geometry at the boron atoms. All nine atoms of this anion lie on the same plane.

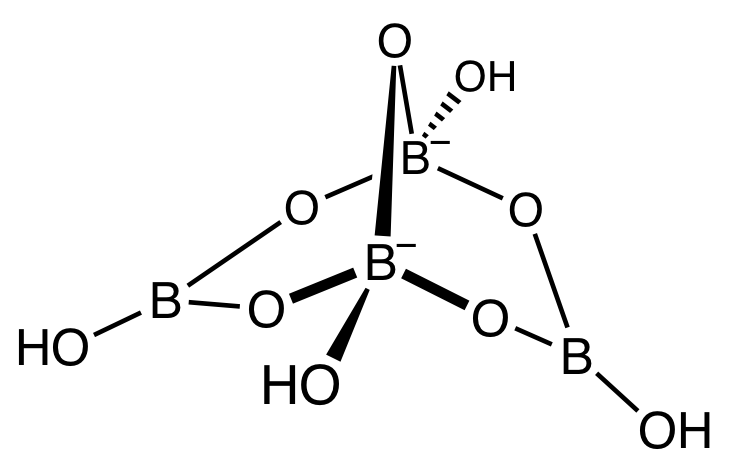
The structure of the tetrahydroxytetraborate ion ([B_{4}O_{5}(OH)_{4}]^{2−}). This anion is a bridged bicyclic molecule, contains oxygen atoms bridging the boron atoms, which are linked to four hydroxyl groups (−OH), one per each boron atom. The anion has a tetrahedral molecular geometry at the two tetracoordinated boron atoms. It has a trigonal planar molecular geometry at the two tricoordinated boron atoms.

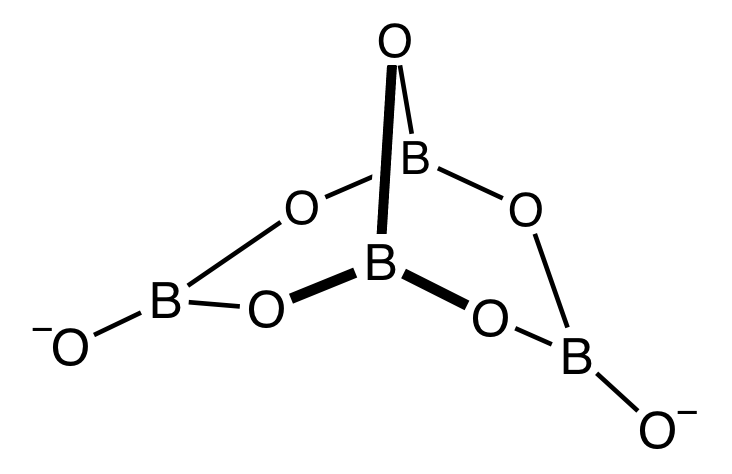
The structure of the tetraborate ion ([B_{4}O_{7}]^{2−}). This anion has the same topology as the tetrahydroxytetraborate ion, but without the hydroxyl groups and all boron atoms have a trigonal planar molecular geometry.

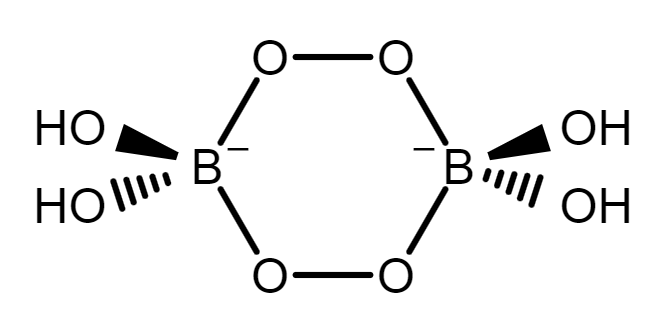
The structure of the perborate ion ([B_{2}O_{4}(OH)_{4}]^{2−}). This anion is a cyclic molecule with a tetrahedral molecular geometry at the boron atoms. It contains two bridging peroxide groups (−O−O−) and four hydroxyl groups (−OH) attached to boron atoms, two per each boron. The ring has a chair conformation.

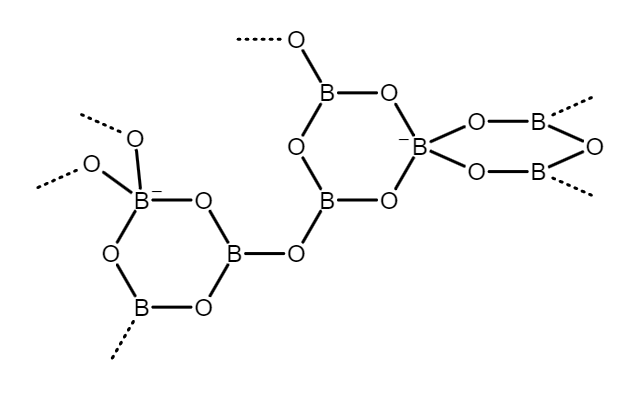
The structure of the repeating unit of the octaborate ion ([B_{8}O_{13}]^{2−}) in the alpha form of disodium octaborate (α-Na_{2}[B_{8}O_{13}]). This anion is cyclic and polymeric. It has a tetrahedral molecular geometry at the negatively charged boron atoms and a trigonal planar molecular geometry at the neutral boron atoms.

== Preparation ==
In 1905, Burgess and Holt observed that fusing mixtures of boric oxide B_{2}O_{3} and sodium carbonate Na_{2}CO_{3} yielded on cooling two crystalline compounds with definite compositions, consistent with anhydrous borax Na_{2}B_{4}O_{7} (which can be written Na_{2}O·2B_{2}O_{3}) and sodium octaborate Na_{2}B_{8}O_{13} (which can be written Na_{2}O·4B_{2}O_{3}).

== Structures ==
Borate anions (and functional groups) consist of trigonal planar BO_{3} and/or tetrahedral BO_{4} structural units, joined together via shared oxygen atoms (corners) or atom pairs (edges) into larger clusters so as to construct various ions such as [B_{2}O_{5}]^{4−}, [B_{3}O_{8}]^{7−}, [B_{4}O_{12}]^{12−}, [B_{5}O_{6}(OH)_{5}]^{2−}, [B_{6}O_{13}]^{8−}, etc. These anions may be cyclic or linear in structure, and can further polymerize into infinite chains, layers, and tridimensional frameworks. The terminal (unshared) oxygen atoms in the borate anions may be capped with hydrogen atoms (−OH) or may carry a negative charge (−O^{−}).

The planar BO_{3} units may be stacked in the crystal lattice to have π-conjugated molecular orbitals, which often results in useful optical properties such as strong harmonics generation, birefringence, and UV transmission.

Polymeric borate anions, such as LiBO_{2}, may have linear chains of 2, 3 or 4 trigonal BO_{3} structural units, each sharing oxygen atoms with adjacent unit(s). Other anions contain cycles; for instance, NaBO_{2} and KBO_{2} contain the cyclic [B_{3}O_{6}]^{3−} ion, consisting of a six-membered ring of alternating boron and oxygen atoms with one extra oxygen atom attached to each boron atom.

The thermal expansion of crystalline borates is dominated by the fact that BO_{3} and BO_{4} polyhedra and rigid groups consisting of these polyhedra practically do not change their configuration and size upon heating, but sometimes rotate like hinges, which results in greatly anisotropic thermal expansion including linear negative expansion.

== Reactions ==
=== Aqueous solution ===
In aqueous solution, boric acid B(OH)_{3} can act as a weak Brønsted acid, that is, a proton donor, with pK_{a} ~ 9. However, it more often acts as a Lewis acid, accepting an electron pair from a hydroxide ion produced by the water autoprotolysis:

B(OH)_{3} + 2 H_{2}O ⇌ [B(OH)_{4}]^{−} + H_{3}O^{+} (pK = 8.98)

This reaction is very fast, with a characteristic time less than 10 μs. Polymeric boron oxoanions are formed in aqueous solution of boric acid at pH 7–10 if the boron concentration is higher than about 0.025 mol/L. The best known of these is the tetraborate ion [B_{4}O_{7}]^{2−}, found in the mineral borax:

4 [B(OH)_{4}]^{−} + 2 H^{+} ⇌ [B_{4}O_{5}(OH)_{4}]^{2−} + 7 H_{2}O

Other anions observed in solution are triborate(1−) and pentaborate(1−), in equilibrium with boric acid and tetrahydroxyborate according to the following overall reactions:

2 B(OH)_{3} + [B(OH)_{4}]^{−} ⇌ [B_{3}O_{3}(OH)_{4}]^{−} + 3 H_{2}O (fast, pK = −1.92)

4 B(OH)_{3} + [B(OH)_{4}]^{−} ⇌ [B_{5}O_{6}(OH)_{4}]^{−} + 6 H_{2}O (slow, pK = −2.05)

In the pH range 6.8 to 8.0, any alkali salts of "boric oxide" anions with general formula [B_{x}O_{y}(OH)_{z}]((q^{−}) where 3x + q = 2y + z will eventually equilibrate in solution to a mixture of B(OH)_{3}, [B(OH)_{4}]^{−}, [B_{3}O_{3}(OH)_{4}]^{−}, and [B_{5}O_{6}(OH)_{4}]^{−}.

Like the complexed borates mentioned above, these ions are more acidic than boric acid. As a result, the pH of a concentrated polyborate solution will increase more than expected when diluted with water.

=== Borate salts ===
Several metal borates are known. They can be obtained by treating boric acid or boron oxides with metal oxides.

=== Mixed anion salts ===
Some chemicals contain another anion in addition to borate. These include borate chlorides, borate carbonates, borate nitrates, borate sulfates, borate phosphates.

=== Complex oxyanions containing boron ===
More complex anions can be formed by condensing borate triangles or tetrahedra with other oxyanions to yield materials such as borosulfates, boroselenates, borotellurates, boroantimonates, borophosphates, or boroselenites.

Borosilicate glass, also known as pyrex, can be viewed as a silicate in which some [SiO_{4}]^{4−} units are replaced by [BO_{4}]^{5−} centers, together with additional cations to compensate for the difference in valence states of Si(IV) and B(III). Because this substitution leads to imperfections, the material is slow to crystallise. It forms a glass with a low coefficient of thermal expansion, thus resistant to cracking when heated, unlike soda glass.

== Uses ==
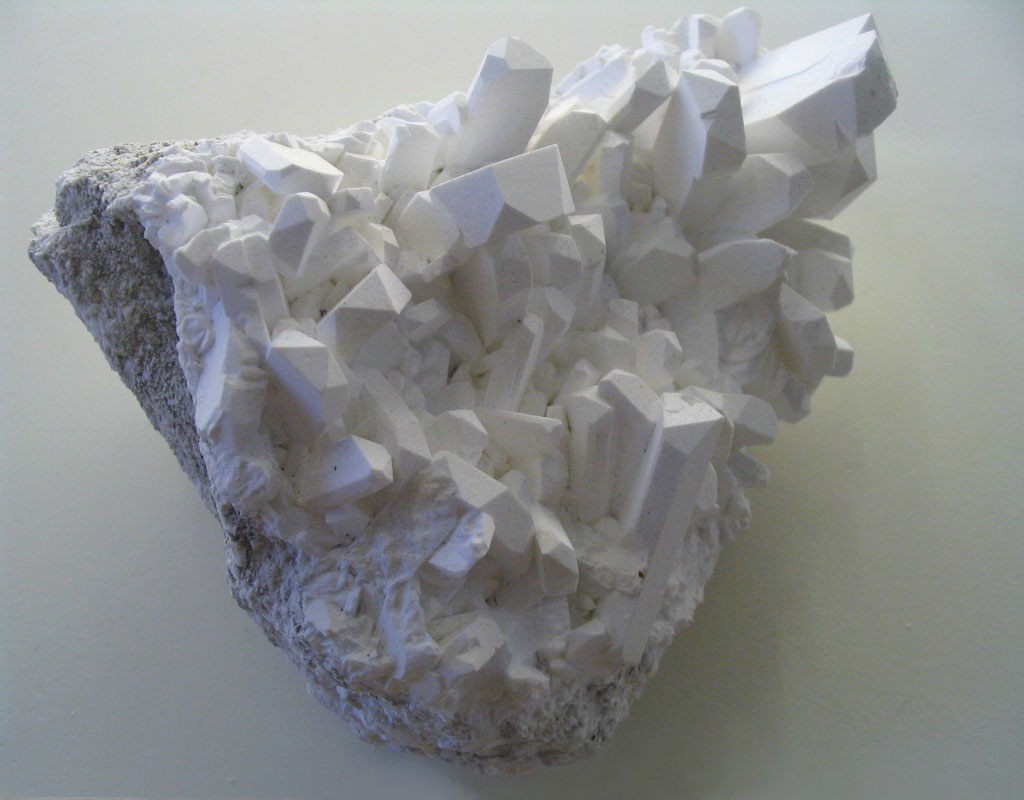
Borax crystals

Lithium metaborate, lithium tetraborate, or a mixture of the two, can be used to prepare borate fusion samples for analysis by XRF, AAS, ICP-OES and ICP-MS. Borate fusion and energy dispersive X-ray fluorescence spectrometry with polarized excitation have been used to analyse contaminated soils.

Disodium octaborate tetrahydrate Na_{2}B_{8}O_{13}·4H_{2}O (commonly abbreviated DOT) is used as a wood preservative and a fungicide. Zinc borate is used as a flame retardant.

Some borates with large anions and multiple cations, such as K_{2}Al_{2}B_{2}O_{7} and Cs_{3}Zn_{6}B_{9}O_{21}, have been considered for applications in nonlinear optics.

== Borate esters ==
Borate esters are organic compounds which can be conveniently prepared by the stoichiometric condensation reaction of boric acid with alcohols (or their chalcogen analogs).

== Thin films ==
Metal borate thin films have been grown by a variety of techniques, including liquid-phase epitaxy (e.g. FeBO_{3}, β-BaB_{2}O_{4}), electron-beam evaporation (e.g. CrBO_{3}, β-BaB_{2}O_{4}), pulsed laser deposition (e.g. β-BaB_{2}O_{4}, Eu(BO_{2})_{3}), and atomic layer deposition (ALD). Growth by ALD was achieved using precursors composed of the tris(pyrazolyl)borate ligand and either ozone or water as the oxidant to deposit CaB_{2}O_{4}, SrB_{2}O_{4}, BaB_{2}O_{4}, Mn_{3}(BO_{3})_{2}, and CoB_{2}O_{4} films.

== Physiology ==
Borate anions are found largely as the undissociated acid in aqueous solution at physiological pH. No further metabolism occurs in either animals or plants. In animals, boric acid/borate salts are completely absorbed following oral ingestion. Absorption occurs via inhalation, although quantitative data are unavailable. Limited data indicate that boric acid/salts are not absorbed through intact skin to any significant extent, although absorption occurs through severely abraded skin. It is distributed throughout the body, is not retained in tissues except for bone, and is rapidly excreted in the urine.

== See also ==
- Nanochannel glass materials
- Porous glass
- Vycor glass
- Silly Putty
- Slime (toy)
- Tris(2,2,2-trifluoroethyl) borate
- Triethanolamine borate
