= Disodium enneaborate =

Identifiers
3D model (JSmol)	Interactive image
- InChI: InChI=1S/B8H4O15.BH3O3.2Na.2H2O/c9-1-14-2(10)17-6(16-1)19-7-18-5(13)22-8(23-7)20-3(11)15-4(12)21-8;2-1(3)4;;;;/h9-12H;2-4H;;;2*1H2/q-2;;2*+1;; Key: FUFQAFYJPUNFLR-UHFFFAOYSA-N
- SMILES: [Na+].[Na+].[O]B1O[B-]2(OB(O)OB(O)O2)OB(O1)O[B-]3OB(O)OB(O)O3.OB(O)O.O.O

Properties
Chemical formula	B_{9}H_{22}Na_{2}O_{20}
Molar mass	485.43 g·mol^{−1}

Related compounds
Related compounds	Borax; Sodium pentaborate Disodium octaborate Trisodium borate Sodium metaborate
- Except where otherwise noted, data are given for materials in their standard state (at 25 °C [77 °F], 100 kPa). Infobox references

Disodium enneaborate is the traditional name for a salt of sodium, boron, oxygen, and hydrogen, with elemental formula Na_{2}B_{9}H_{22}O_{20} or Na_{2}B_{9}O_{9}·11H_{2}O. It is the sodium borate with the highest boron/sodium ratio.

== Structure ==
The correct formula has since been determined to be (Na^{+})_{2}[B_{8}O_{11}(OH)_{4}]^{2−}·B(OH)_{3}·2H_{2}O. The anion is a linear polymer with repeating unit [−B_{8}O_{11}(OH)_{4}−]^{2−}. Sodium cations, water molecules, and undissociated boric acid molecules B(OH)_{3} lie between the chains, held by numerous hydrogen bonds.

The compound crystallizes in the monoclinic crystal system with space group P2_{1}/n. The cell parameters are a = 1021.3 pm, b = 1294.0 pm, c = 1245.7 pm, β = 93.070°, V = 1.6440 nm^{3}, and Z = 2. The sodium cations occur in groups of four with interatomic distances of 378.30 pm and 379.32 pm.

== Reactions ==
Upon heating, disodium enneaborate initially becomes amorphous and then crystallizes as anhydrous disodium octaborate α-Na_{2}B_{8}O_{13} along with amorphous B_{2}O_{3}. Notably, the former contains octaborate fundamental building blocks that are topologically equivalent to those in the enneaborate.
