= Copper(II) borate =

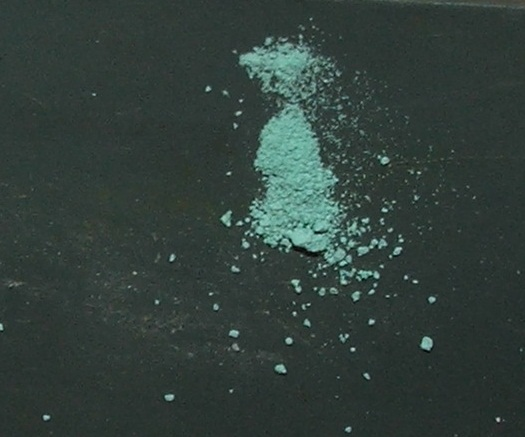

Names
- IUPAC name Copper(II) borate
- Other names Cupric orthoborate

Identifiers
CAS Number	39290-85-2
3D model (JSmol)	Interactive image
ChemSpider	148800
ECHA InfoCard	100.049.438
EC Number	254-401-2
PubChem CID	170177
UNII	HV7U2MWH9N
CompTox Dashboard (EPA)	DTXSID10885769
- InChI: InChI=1S/2BO3.3Cu/c2*2-1(3)4;;;/q2*-3;3*+2 Key: CQDTUBLRLRFEJX-UHFFFAOYSA-N
- SMILES: B([O-])([O-])[O-].B([O-])([O-])[O-].[Cu+2].[Cu+2].[Cu+2]

Properties
Chemical formula	B_{2}Cu_{3}O_{6}
Molar mass	308.25 g·mol^{−1}
Appearance	Dark green solid
Density	4.54
Solubility in water	Insoluble

Structure
Crystal structure	Triclinic

Hazards
- GHS labelling
Pictograms	(GHS07: Exclamation mark)
Signal word	Warning
Hazard statements	H302, H312, H315, H320, H332
Precautionary statements	P280, P301+P312, P302+P352, P304+P340, P305+P351+P338, P332+P313
NFPA 704 (fire diamond)	0 0 0

Related compounds
Other cations	Sodium orthoborate
- Except where otherwise noted, data are given for materials in their standard state (at 25 °C [77 °F], 100 kPa). Infobox references

Copper(II) borate is an inorganic compound with the formula Cu_{3}(BO_{3})_{2}. It consists of copper atoms in their cupric oxidation state and orthoborate groups. In the 19th century it was proposed to be used as a green pigment to replace the very toxic paris green. It has been studied for its photocatalytic properties.

== Preparation ==
Copper(II) borate can be prepared by heating a stoichiometric mixture of copper(II) oxide and diboron trioxide to 900 °C.

3CuO + B_{2}O_{3} → Cu_{3}(BO_{3})_{2}
