= Borate carbonate =

Mixed anion compound containing both borate and carbonate ions

The borate carbonates are mixed anion compounds containing both borate and carbonate ions. Compared to mixed anion compounds containing halides, these are quite rare. They are hard to make, requiring higher temperatures, which are likely to decompose carbonate to carbon dioxide. The reason for the difficulty of formation is that when entering a crystal lattice, the anions have to be correctly located, and correctly oriented. They are also known as carbonatoborates or borocarbonates. Although these compounds have been termed carboborate, that word also refers to the C=B=C^{5−} anion, or CB_{11}H_{12}^{−} anion. This last anion should be called 1-carba-closo-dodecaborate or monocarba-closo-dodecaborate. Carboborate can also refer to compounds with anions that have common oxygen between the borate and carbon. These compounds will also be listed in the table.

Some borate carbonates have additional different anions and can be borate carbonate halides or borate carbonate nitrites.

== List ==
	chemical formula	mw	crystal system	space group	unit cell	volume	density	comment	references
Boron hydrogencarbonate	B[μ-H(CO_{3})_{2}]		monoclinic	C2	Z = 2 a = 6.997 b = 3.868 c = 5.0197 β = 101.14°	133.3		at 20 GPa	
Qilianshanite	NaHCO_{3} · H_{3}BO_{3} · 2H_{2}O		monoclinic		a = 16.11 Å, b = 6.92 Å, c = 6.73 Å β = 100.46°		1.635	Biaxial (-) n_{α} = 1.351 n_{β} = 1.459 n_{γ} = 1.486 2V: 50° Max birefringence δ = 0.135	
Canavesite	Mg_{2}(HBO_{3})(CO_{3}) · 5H_{2}O		monoclinic		a = 23.49(2) Å, b = 6.16(6) Å, c = 21.91(2) Å β = 114.91(9)° Z=12?		1.790	Biaxial (+) n_{α} = 1.485 n_{β} = 1.494 n_{γ} = 1.505 2V: 86° Max birefringence: δ = 0.020	
Potassium bis(carbonato)borate hydrate	K[B(CO_{2}-μ-O-CO_{2})_{2}]·2H_{2}O		orthorhombic	Aba2	a=11.058 b=11.169 c=9.0504 Z=4	1117.8		spiro at boron	
	NaK_{15}[B_{4}O_{5}(OH)_{4}]_{6}(NO_{2})_{2}(CO_{3})·7H_{2}O	2035.26	hexagonal	P6̅2c	a=11.1399 c=30.495 Z=2	3277.3	2.062		
	K_{9}[B_{4}O_{5}(OH)_{4}]_{3}(CO_{3})OH⋅7 H_{2}O	1128.82	hexagonal	P6̅2c	a=11.207 c=17.193 Z=2	1870.2	2.005		
	K_{9}[B_{4}O_{5}(OH)_{4}]_{3}(CO_{3})Cl·7H_{2}O	1147.29	hexagonal	P6̅2c	a=11.219 c=17.079 Z=2	1861.8	2.047		
	K_{9}[B_{4}O_{5}(OH)_{4}]_{3}(CO_{3})Br·7H_{2}O	1191.75	hexagonal	P6̅2c	a=11.243 c=17.132 Z=2	1875.4	2.110		
	K_{9}[B_{4}O_{5}(OH)_{4}]_{3}(CO_{3})I⋅7 H_{2}O	1238.74	hexagonal	P6̅2c	a=11.234 c=17.158 Z=2	1875.2	2.194		
	Ca_{4}(Ca_{0.7}Na_{0.3})_{3}(Na_{0.7}□ _{0.3})Li_{5}[B ^{t}_{12}B^{Δ}_{10}O_{36}(O,OH)_{6}](CO_{3})(OH) · (OH,H_{2}O)			R3	a=8.99 c=35.91 Z=3	2513	2.62		
Chiyokoite	Ca_{3}Si(CO_{3}){[B(OH)_{4}]_{0.5}(AsO_{3})_{0.5}}(OH)_{6} · 12H_{2}O		hexagonal	P6_{3}	a = 11.0119, c = 10.5252	1,105.31			
Carboborite	Ca_{2}Mg[B(OH)_{4}]_{2}(CO_{3})_{2} · 4H_{2}O		monoclinic		a = 18.59 Å, b = 6.68 Å, c = 11.32 Å β = 91.68°			Biaxial (-) n_{α} = 1.507 n_{β} = 1.546 n_{γ} = 1.569 Max Birefringence: δ = 0.062	
Borcarite	Ca_{4}MgB_{4}O_{5}(OH)_{6}(CO_{3})_{2}		monoclinic	C2/m	a=17.840 b=8.380 c=4.445 β =102.04	649.906	2.790	Biaxial (-) n_{α} = 1.590 n_{β} = 1.651 n_{γ} = 1.657 2V: 30° Max birefringence: δ = 0.067	
Sakhaite	Ca_{3}Mg(BO_{3})_{2}(CO_{3})_{2}.(H_{2}O)_{0.36}		isometric	Fd3̅m	a = 14.685 Z=4	3166.8			
	Ca_{12}Mg_{4}(BO_{3})_{7}(CO_{3})_{4}(OH)Cl.H_{2}O			Fd3̅					
Harkerite	Ca_{12}Mg_{4}Al(BO_{3})_{3}(SiO_{4})_{4}(CO_{3})_{5} · H_{2}O		trigonal	R3̅m	a = 18.131 Å α = 33.46°	1614		Uniaxial n_{α} = 1.649 - 1.653 n_{β} = 1.649 - 1.653	
Imayoshiite	Ca_{3}Al(CO_{3})[B(OH)_{4}](OH)_{6} · 12H_{2}O		hexagonal	P6_{3}	a = 11.026, c = 10.605	1,117	1.79	Uniaxial (-) n_{ω} = 1.497(2) n_{ε} = 1.470(2) Max birefringence δ = 0.027	
Gaudefroyite	Ca_{4}Mn_{3}O_{3}(BO_{3})_{3}CO_{3}		hexagonal	P6_{3}/m	a = 10.6 Å, c = 5.9 Å	574	3.529	black Uniaxial (+) n_{ω} = 1.805 - 1.810 n_{ε} = 2.015 - 2.020 Max Birefringence:δ = 0.210	
Numanoite	Ca_{4}Cu(B_{4}O_{6}(OH)_{6})(CO_{3})_{2}		monoclinic	C2/m	a = 17.794 Å, b = 8.381 Å, c = 4.4494 Å β = 102.42° Z=2			bluish green Biaxial (-) n_{α}=1.618 n_{β}=1.658 n_{γ}=1.672 2V: 60° Max birefringence: δ = 0.054	
	Rb_{9}[B_{4}O_{5}(OH)_{4}]_{3}(CO_{3})Cl⋅7 H_{2}O	1564.59	hexagonal	P6̅2c	a=11.325 c=17.181 Z=2	1908.3	2.502		
	Rb_{9}[B_{4}O_{5}(OH)_{4}]_{3}(CO_{3})Br⋅7 H_{2}O	1609.08	hexagonal	P6̅2c	a=11.482 c=17.463 Z=2	1993.9	2.680		
	Rb_{9}[B_{4}O_{5}(OH)_{4}]_{3}(CO_{3})I⋅7 H_{2}O	1656.07	hexagonal	P6̅2c	a=11.451 c=17.476 Z=2	1984.5	2.771		
	NaRb_{3}B_{6}O_{9}(OH)_{3}(HCO_{3})		monoclinic	P2_{1}	a = 8.988 Å, b = 8.889 Å, c = 10.068 Å, and β = 114.6°				
	Sr_{5}(CO_{3})_{2}(BO_{3})_{2}		orthorhombic	Pnma	a = 7.387 b = 16.556 c = 8.971 Z = 4			UV cut off 190 nm	
	Sr_{2}CuO_{2}(CO_{3})_{0.85}(BO_{3})_{0.15}			I4̅					
	Sr(Na_{0.4}Sr_{0.1})Na_{2}[B_{5}O_{8}(OH)_{2}] · (CO_{3})1 − x			B2/b					
Moydite-(Y)	Y[B(OH)_{4}](CO_{3})		orthorhombic						
	K_{6}[Cd_{2}(CO_{3})_{2}(B_{12}O_{18})(OH)_{6}]	1099.19	orthorhombic	Pnnm	a=13.0603 b=9.1059 c=12.3860 Z=2	1473.0	2.478	colorless	
	Rb_{6}[Cd_{2}(CO_{3})_{2}(B_{12}O_{18})(OH)_{6}]	1377.41	orthorhombic	Pnnm	a=13.3484 b=9.2665 c=12.4946 Z=2	1545.5	2.960	colorless	
	Ba_{2}(BO_{3})_{1-x}(CO_{3})_{x}Cl_{x} x=0.1			P3̅m1					
	Ba_{3}[B_{6}O_{10}(OH)_{2}](CO_{3})	730.905	monoclinic		a=6.5351, b=8.3455, c =11.3489, and β = 98.9568° Z=2	611.4	3.970		
	Ba_{5}(CO_{3})_{2}(BO_{3})_{2}	924.34	orthorhombic	Pnma	a=7.923 b=17.508 c=9.114 Z=4	1268.4	4.84		
	Ba_{4}Sr(CO_{3})_{2}(BO_{3})_{2}	874.63	orthorhombic	Pnma	a=7.731 b=17.349 c=9.048 Z=4	1213.6	7.787		
	Ba_{6}[B_{12}O_{21}(OH)_{2}](CO_{3})_{2}	1443.80	monoclinic		a =6.5485, b = 19.361, c = 18.120, and β = 90.893° Z=4	2297.0	4.175		
	Li_{9}BaB_{15}O_{27}(CO_{3})			P3̅1c	a=8.860, c=15.148				
	Ba_{3}(BO_{3})(CO_{3})F	549.84	trigonal	R3̅	a=10.1799 c=18.530 Z=9	1663.0	4.941		
	Pb_{7}O(OH)_{3}(CO_{3})_{3}(BO_{3})	1756.19	hexagonal	P6_{3}/mc	a=10.519 c=8.90 Z=2	853	6.839	SHG 4.5×KDP	
Mereheadite	Pb_{47}O_{24}(OH)_{13}Cl_{25}(BO_{3})_{2}(CO_{3})		monoclinic	Cm	a = 17.372, b = 27.942, c = 10.6661, β = 93.152^{o}	5169.6			
Britvinite	[Pb_{7}(OH)_{3}F(BO_{3})_{2}(CO_{3})][Mg_{4.5}(OH)_{3}(Si_{5}O_{14})]		triclinic	P1	a = 9.3409, b = 9.3579, c = 18.833 α = 80.365°, β = 75.816°, γ = 59.870° Z=2	1378.7	5.51	Biaxial (-) n_{α} = 1.896 n_{β} = 1.903 n_{γ} = 1.903 2V 20° Max birefringence δ = 0.007	
Roymillerite	Pb_{24}Mg_{9}(Si_{10}O_{28})(CO_{3})_{10}(BO_{3})(SiO_{4})(OH)_{13}O_{5}		triclinic	P1̅	a = 9.316, b = 9.316, c = 26.463 α = 83.295°, β = 83.308°, γ = 60.023° Z=1	1971.2	5.973	Biaxial (-) n_{α} = 1.860 n_{β} = 1.940 n_{γ} = 1.940 2V 5° Max birefringence δ = 0.080	
