= Orthoborate =

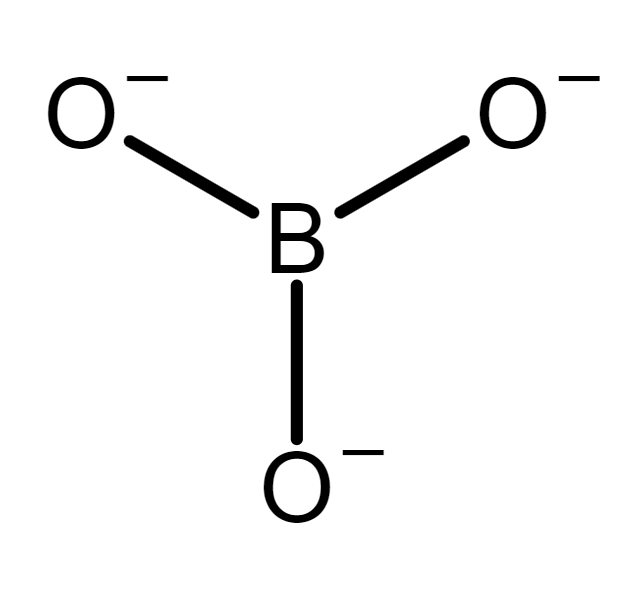
- Skeletal formula of the orthoborate anion

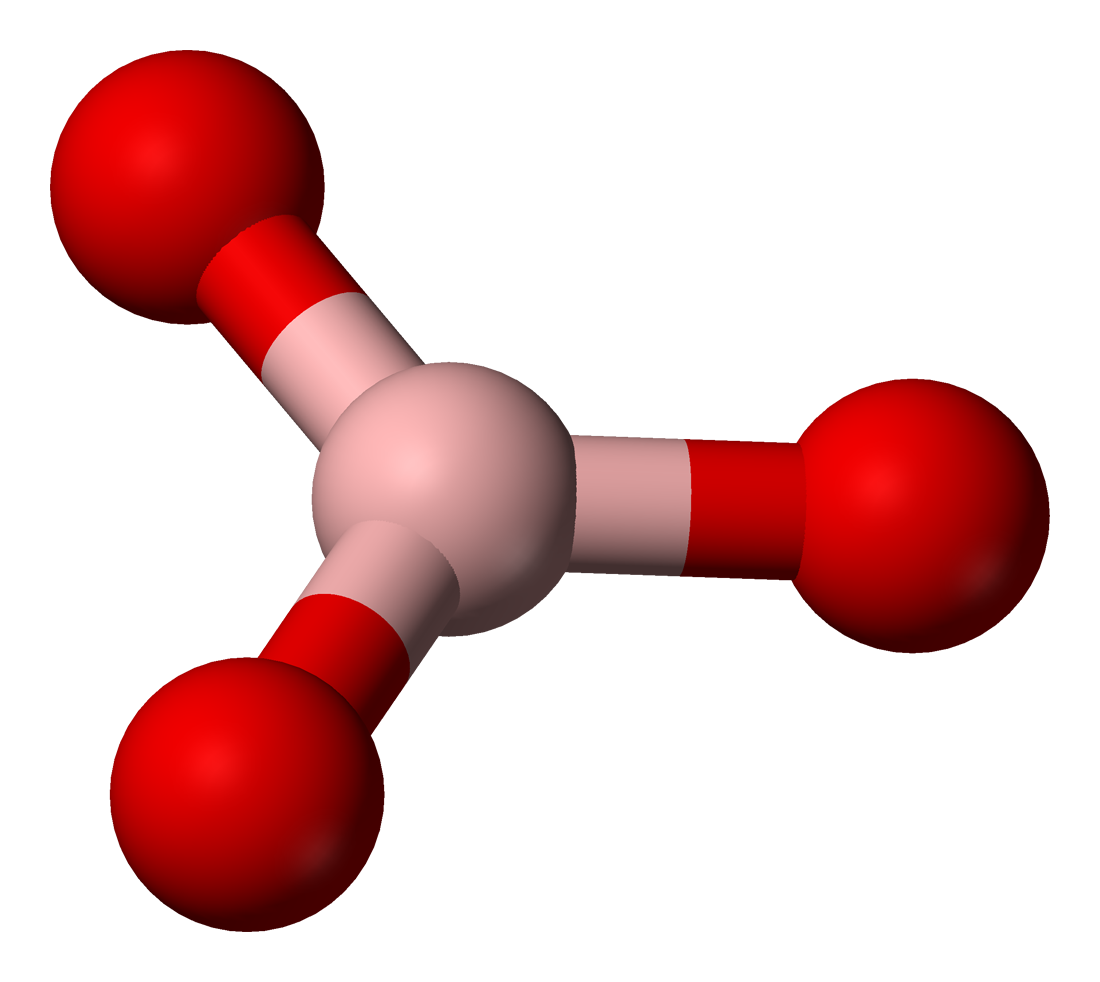
- Ball-and-stick model of the orthoborate anion.

Names
- IUPAC name Borate
- Other names trioxidoborate(3-)

Identifiers
CAS Number	11129-12-7; 14213-97-9
3D model (JSmol)	Interactive image
ChEBI	CHEBI:22908
ChemSpider	24755
PubChem CID	26574
- InChI: InChI=1S/BO3/c2-1(3)4/q-3 Key: BTBUEUYNUDRHOZ-UHFFFAOYSA-N
- SMILES: B([O-])([O-])[O-]

Properties
Chemical formula	[BO_{3}]^{3−}
Molar mass	58.81 g·mol^{−1}
- Except where otherwise noted, data are given for materials in their standard state (at 25 °C [77 °F], 100 kPa). Infobox references

In inorganic chemistry, an orthoborate is a polyatomic anion with formula [BO_{3}]^{3−} or a salt containing the anion; such as trisodium orthoborate (Na^{+})_{3}[BO_{3}]^{3−}. It is one of several boron oxyanions, or borates.

The name is also used in organic chemistry for the trivalent functional group B(O−)_{3}, or any compound (ester) that contains it, such as triethyl orthoborate B(OC_{2}H_{5})_{3}.

== Structure ==
The orthoborate ion is known in the solid state, for example, in calcium orthoborate (Ca^{2+})_{3}([BO_{3}]^{3−})_{2}, where it adopts a nearly trigonal planar structure. It is a structural analogue of the carbonate anion [CO_{3}]^{2−}, with which it is isoelectronic. Simple bonding theories point to the trigonal planar structure. In terms of valence bond theory, the bonds are formed by using sp^{2} hybrid orbitals on boron.

Some compounds termed orthoborates do not necessarily contain the trigonal planar ion. For example, gadolinium orthoborate GdBO_{3} contains the planar [BO_{3}]^{3−} ion only a high temperatures; otherwise it contains the polyborate anion [B_{3}O_{9}]^{9−}.

== Reactions ==
=== Solution in water ===
When orthoborate salts are dissolved in water, the anion converts mostly to boric acid B(OH)_{3} and other hydrogen-containing borate anions, mainly tetrahydroxyborate [B(OH)_{4}]^{−}. The reactions of orthoborate in solution are therefore mostly those of these compounds.

In particular, these reactions include the condensation of tetrahydroxoborate with cis-vicinal diols such as mannitol, sorbitol, glucose and glycerol, to form relatively stable anion esters. This reaction is used in analytic chemistry to determine the concentration of borate anions.

== See also ==
- Metaborate
- Tetraborate
