= Metaborate =

Boron-oxygen anion or functional group

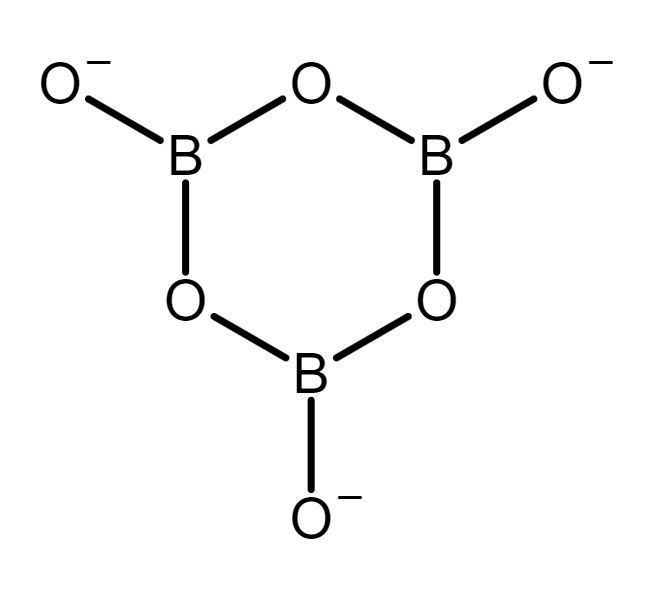
- Trimeric metaborate ion

Names
- IUPAC name Metaborate

Identifiers
CAS Number	14100-65-3
3D model (JSmol)	Interactive image
ChEBI	CHEBI:30173
ChemSpider	2283207
Gmelin Reference	1047
CompTox Dashboard (EPA)	DTXSID901317310
- InChI: InChI=1S/BO2/c2-1-3/q-1 Key: VDLZIANVOYDKFH-UHFFFAOYSA-N
- SMILES: B(=O)[O-]

Properties
Chemical formula	BO^{−}_{2}
Molar mass	42.81 g·mol^{−1}

Related compounds
Related compounds	Borate; Boric acid; Orthoborate; Tetraborate; Tetrahydroxyborate
- Except where otherwise noted, data are given for materials in their standard state (at 25 °C [77 °F], 100 kPa). Infobox references

A metaborate is a borate anion consisting of boron and oxygen, with empirical formula BO^{−}_{2}. Metaborate also refers to any salt or ester of such anion (e.g. salts such as sodium metaborate NaBO_{2} or calcium metaborate Ca(BO_{2})_{2}, and esters such as methyl metaborate CH_{3}BO_{2}). Metaborate is one of the boron's oxyanions. Metaborates can be monomeric, oligomeric or polymeric.

In aqueous solutions metaborate anion hydrolyzes to tetrahydroxyborate [B(OH)_{4}]^{−}. For this reason, solutions or hydrated salts of the latter are often improperly named "metaborates".

== Structure ==
=== Solid state ===
In the solid state of their salts, metaborate ions are often oligomeric or polymeric, conceptually resulting from the fusion of two or more BO^{−}_{2} through shared oxygen atoms. In these anions, the boron atom forms covalent bonds with either three or four oxygen atoms. Some of the structures are:

- A trimer with formula B_{3}O^{3−}_{6} or (−B(−O^{−})−O−)_{3}, consisting of a six-membered ring of alternating boron and oxygen atoms with one extra oxygen atom attached to each boron atom. This form is found, for example, in some anhydrous alkali metal salts like sodium metaborate or potassium metaborate, in α- and β-barium metaborate Ba_{3}(B_{3}O_{6})_{2}, and in the mixed salt potassium cadmium metaborate KCdB_{3}O_{6}. The three B–O distances are nearly equal in the potassium salt (133.1, 139.8, and 139.8 pm) but significantly different in the sodium one (128.0, 143.3, and 143.3 pm).
- A polymer of BO^{−}_{2} units connected by single shared-oxygen bridges; that is, ···(−B(−O^{−})−O−)_{n}···. Occurs in calcium metaborate CaB_{2}O_{4} or Ca(BO_{2})_{2}.
- A tridimensional network of BO_{4} tetrahedral groups, as in "zinc metaborate", which is actually a mixed salt zinc metaborate oxide, with the formula (Zn^{2+})_{4}(O^{2−})(BO^{−}_{2})_{6}.
- A tridimensional regular array of [B(−O−)_{4}]^{−} tetrahedra sharing oxygen vertices, as in the high-pressure and high-temperature γ form of lithium metaborate LiBO_{2}.

=== Aqueous solution ===
The cyclic trimer anions dissociate almost completely in aqueous solution giving mainly tetrahydroxyborate anions:

B_{3}O^{3−}_{6} + 6 H_{2}O $\ce{<=>>}$ 3 [B(OH)_{4}]^{−}

Other molecules and anions, such as B(OH)_{3}, [B_{3}O_{3}(OH)_{4}]^{−}, [B_{3}O_{3}(OH)_{5}]^{2−}, and B_{4}O_{5}(OH)^{2−}_{4} are less than 5% at 26 °C.

In 1937, Nielsen and Ward claimed that the metaborate anion in solution has a linear symmetric structure ^{−}O−B^{+}−O^{−} with negative charges on the oxygens and a positive charge on the boron, or O=B^{−}=O with negative charge on the boron. However, this claim has been disproved.

=== Gas phase ===
The vapor of cesium metaborate has neutral monomers CsBO_{2} and dimers Cs_{2}[B_{2}O_{4}] as well as ionized versions thereof. The same situation holds for thallium metaborate TlBO_{2}.

== Solid solutions ==
In 1964 Hisatsune and Surez investigated the infrared spectrum of metaborate anions in dilute solid solutions of potassium salt in alkali halides such as potassium chloride KCl.
