= Hexahydroborite =

Borate mineral

Hexahydroborite is a mineral composed of calcium, boron, oxygen, and hydrogen, with formula CaB_{2}H_{12}O_{6}, more precisely [Ca^{2+}]([B(OH_{4})]^{−})_{2}·2H_{2}O.

Hexahydroborite is the end member of a series of natural metaborates with the general formula CaB_{2}O_{4}·nH_{2}O or CaO·B_{2}O_{3}·nH_{2}O with n varying from 0 to 6, the other end member being anhydrous calciborite CaB_{2}O_{4}.

The anion in the structure is tetrahydroxyborate, [B(OH_{4})]^{−}. The name comes from an interpretation of the formula as CaBO_{3}·6H_{2}O.

== History and occurrence ==
The mineral was originally described by M. A. Simonov in 1976 from a sample found in a kurchatovite-sakhaite ore deposit in Solongo, Buryat Republic. The sample was recovered from 200 m underground, associated with pentahydroborite. the hexahydroborite was identified by X-ray diffraction. Gas/liquid inclusions suggest that the hexahydroborite crystallized after the pentahydroborite.

The mineral was identified also at a location in Fuka, Japan. It occurred in a layer between crystalline limestone and skarns, in association with olshanskyite and calcite. It was conjectured to be formed by hydrothermal alteration of takaedite at low temperatures, around 250 °C.

The mineral was synthesized in 2011.

== Structure ==
The structure (observed in the synthetic material) consists of infinite columns parallel to the c axis, identically oriented, displaced along the other two axes and linked only by hydrogen bonds. The columns are formed by calcium polyhedra linked together and to B(OH)_{4} orthotetrahedra by sharing edges.

The crystal cell is monoclinic with the following parameters:

a (pm)	b (pm)	c (pm)	β (°)	V (nm^{3})	Sample
800.6	664.9	801.9	104.2	0.4134	Solongo
1601.1	668.8	795.4	103.8	-	Fuka
799.41	663.21	798.71	104.16	0.41058	Synthetic

The density calculated for the synthetic version is 1.891 g/cm^{3}.

== Properties ==
The mineral occurs in nature as flattened prismatic crystals, clear and transparent, with density 1.84 to 1.87 g/cm^{3} and Mohs hardness 2.5. The crystals may exhibit bluish-white photoluminescence.

The mineral is optically biaxial positive with 2V = 83°. The refractive index is 1.50, with slightly increasing values for α, β, and γ; the difference γ−α is 0.012 by Simonov, and 0.007 by Kusachi. It has strong dispersion, increasing from violet to red.

The compound is slowly soluble in water and insoluble in ethanol, contradicting an earlier report. It is promptly dissolved by hydrochloric, sulfuric, and acetic acid. On heating, it loses a significant amount of water between 90 and 110 °C, but dehydration is complete only over 800 °C, leaving anhydrous calcium metaborate CaB_{2}O_{4}.

The synthetic version was obtained by recrystallization of calciborite CaB_{2}O_{4} from H_{2}O in presence of B_{2}O_{3} at 250 °C and 70–80 atm.
