= Triethanolamine borate =

Names
- IUPAC name 2,8,9-trioxa-5-aza-1-borabicyclo[3.3.3]undecane
- Other names: TEAB; Boratrane; Boratran; Atracor T

Identifiers
CAS Number	283-56-7
3D model (JSmol)	Interactive image
ChemSpider	76554
ECHA InfoCard	100.005.458
EC Number	206-003-5
PubChem CID	84862
UNII	2N1AHN0X56
CompTox Dashboard (EPA)	DTXSID701355429 DTXSID8065874, DTXSID701355429
- InChI: InChI=1S/C6H12BNO3/c1-4-9-7-10-5-2-8(1)3-6-11-7/h1-6H2 Key: NKPKVNRBHXOADG-UHFFFAOYSA-N
- SMILES: C1CN2CCOB(O1)OCC2

Properties
Chemical formula	C_{6}H_{12}BNO_{3}
Molar mass	156.98 g·mol^{−1}
Appearance	white powder
Density	1.3 g/cm^{3}
Melting point	235–237 °C (455–459 °F; 508–510 K)
Solubility in water	soluble
- Except where otherwise noted, data are given for materials in their standard state (at 25 °C [77 °F], 100 kPa). Infobox references

Triethanolamine borate, also commonly known as boratrane, is an inorganic compound with the chemical formula C_{6}H_{12}BNO_{3}. The compound belongs to the class of borates.

== Structure ==
Triethanolamine borate is not a single discrete molecule but rather a coordination complex or salt formed between the Lewis acidic boron center of boric acid and the Lewis basic nitrogen and hydroxyl groups of triethanolamine. The exact structure depends on the molar ratio of reactants, pH, and reaction conditions. In the most common 1:1 complex, boron coordinates with the tertiary amine nitrogen and/or hydroxyl oxygen atoms of triethanolamine, forming a chelated structure that enhances solubility and stability compared to the parent compounds.

== Synthesis ==
Triethanolamine borate can be obtained by reacting an aqueous solution of equal parts boric acid and triethanolamine.

== Physical properties ==
Triethanolamine borate forms a white, odorless crystalline powder that is soluble in water. The compound has an orthorhombic crystal structure.

The compound is also soluble in organic solvents such as acetone, acetonitrile, pyridine, nitrobenzene, acetic acid, chloroform, and the alcohols. It is slightly soluble in petroleum ether and cold benzene, but insoluble in carbon tetrachloride.

== Uses ==
The compound is commonly used as a corrosion inhibitor, surfactant, buffering agent, and stabilizer in various industrial and consumer applications.

It is also used in colorimetric test strips for urinalysis, as a reagent for the monoalkylation of ketones, and as a hardener for epoxy resins.
