= Canavesite =

Carboborate mineral

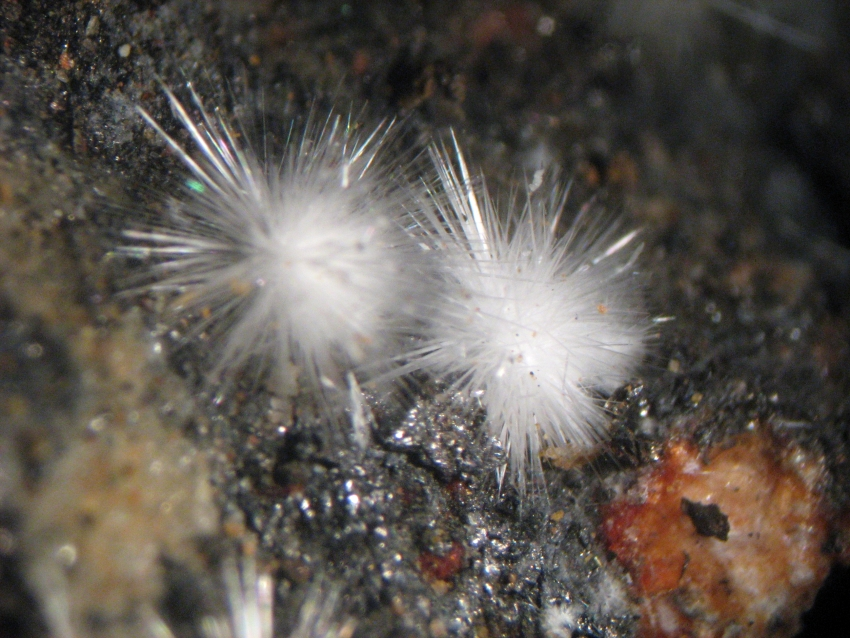
- Canavesite (field of view: 8 mm)

General
- Category: Carboborate Mineral
- Formula: Mg_{2}(HBO_{3})(CO_{3})∙5H_{2}O
- IMA symbol: Cnv
- Strunz classification: 6.HA.50
- Crystal system: Monoclinic; Unknown space group
- Crystal class: Prismatic (2/m) (same H-M symbol)

Identification
- Formula mass: 258.51 g/mol
- Color: milky white to colorless
- Crystal habit: Acicular - Occurs as needle-like crystal and Rosette - Bundled tabular aggregates resembling rose flower petals
- Cleavage: on {h01}, on one or more sets
- Tenacity: Slightly flexible
- Luster: vitreous, silky in aggregates
- Streak: white
- Density: 1.8 g/cm^{−3}
- Optical properties: transparent
- Other characteristics: Effervesces at room temp. with HCL

Canavesite, Mg_{2}(HBO_{3})(CO_{3})∙5H_{2}O, is a rare carboborate mineral from the abandoned Brosso mine in Italy. Canavesite is a secondary mineral that occurs due to the weathering of ludwigite-magnetite skarn on the surface of mine walls. The physical properties consist of milky-white rosette-like aggregates of elongated transparent fibers shown in figure one. It has the crystal symmetry of a monoclinic with a diffraction symbol of 2/mP-/-.

== History ==
Giussani & Vighi saw and described boron mineralization in 1964 in a pyrite mine, Brosso, in Italy. They noticed secondary minerals forming between szaibelyite and ludwigite at the point where they come into contact with each other inside magnetite skarns. Years later in 1972 a few members from the Gruppo Mineralogico Lombardo found the first sample of a new unknown mineral around the same location. Since then canavesite has been traded as nesquehonite and added to geologic collections. Canavesite is one of few known carboborates. The name canavesite originates from the district of Canavese where the pyrite mine is located.

== Composition ==
Canavesite has the chemical formula Mg_{2}(HBO_{3})(CO_{3})∙5H_{2}O, which makes it a carboborate mineral. Having two complete chemical analyses and one partial gives MgO (31.06),B_{2}O_{3}(12.70),CO_{2}(18.57)H_{2}O(37.44) and MgO (31.18),B_{2}O_{3}(13.47),CO_{2}(17.02)H_{2}O(38.33) in weight % oxides. Taking eleven oxygen ions, one can calculate from this data the empirical formula is: Mg_{2.03}(HBO_{3})_{1.09}(CO_{3})∙4.91H_{2}O. A canavesite infrared spectrum is unlike that of well known families. It has bands near 3500, 1450, and 1000 cm-1 looks almost like OH^{−}. With a dilute HCl at or near room temperature canavesite will produce tiny bubbles of gas and foam with hissing sounds. The molecular formula has not been obtained for canavesite. The approximate density was obtained using the heavy liquid method, which shows a density of 1.8 g cm^{−3}.

== Occurrence ==
The Vola Gera tunnel in the Brosso mine is located in a village northwest of Ivrea, Piedmont, Italy in Canavese district. The mine was initially a pyrite mine but it was abandoned. It is a well known mine for fine minerals that build up between the zone where monzonite stock and marbles interbedded in the mica schists of the Sesia-Lanzo zone. Mineralization of boron within magnetite skarns were first reported by Giussani and Vighi in 1964. There has since been more canavesite discovered in New Jersey at the Sterling Mine. They are the only two places that have been known to produce the secondary mineral.

== Physical properties ==
Canavesite occurs as a milky rosette-like aggregates of very thin [010] elongated fibers on surfaces and along fractures of ludwigite and magnetite skarns. Canavesite is an exceptionally rare secondary mineral that forms on the walls of the abandoned mine of Brosso, Italy and has formed since the mine was abandoned due to weathering of these ludwigite and magnetite skarns. Canvesite has a monoclinic P 2/m crystal structure and does not fluoresce under an ultraviolent light. It also has thin and slightly flexible vitreous fibers that are elongated parallel to [010]. Some crystal may show pseudohexagonal prismatic habit, but these cases are rare. The X-ray powder diffraction pattern strongest lines are 9.54(100)202, 8.12(40)(201), 7.80(18)(102,301), 4.56(21)(501,503), and 3.11(19)(407).
