= Trisodium orthoborate =

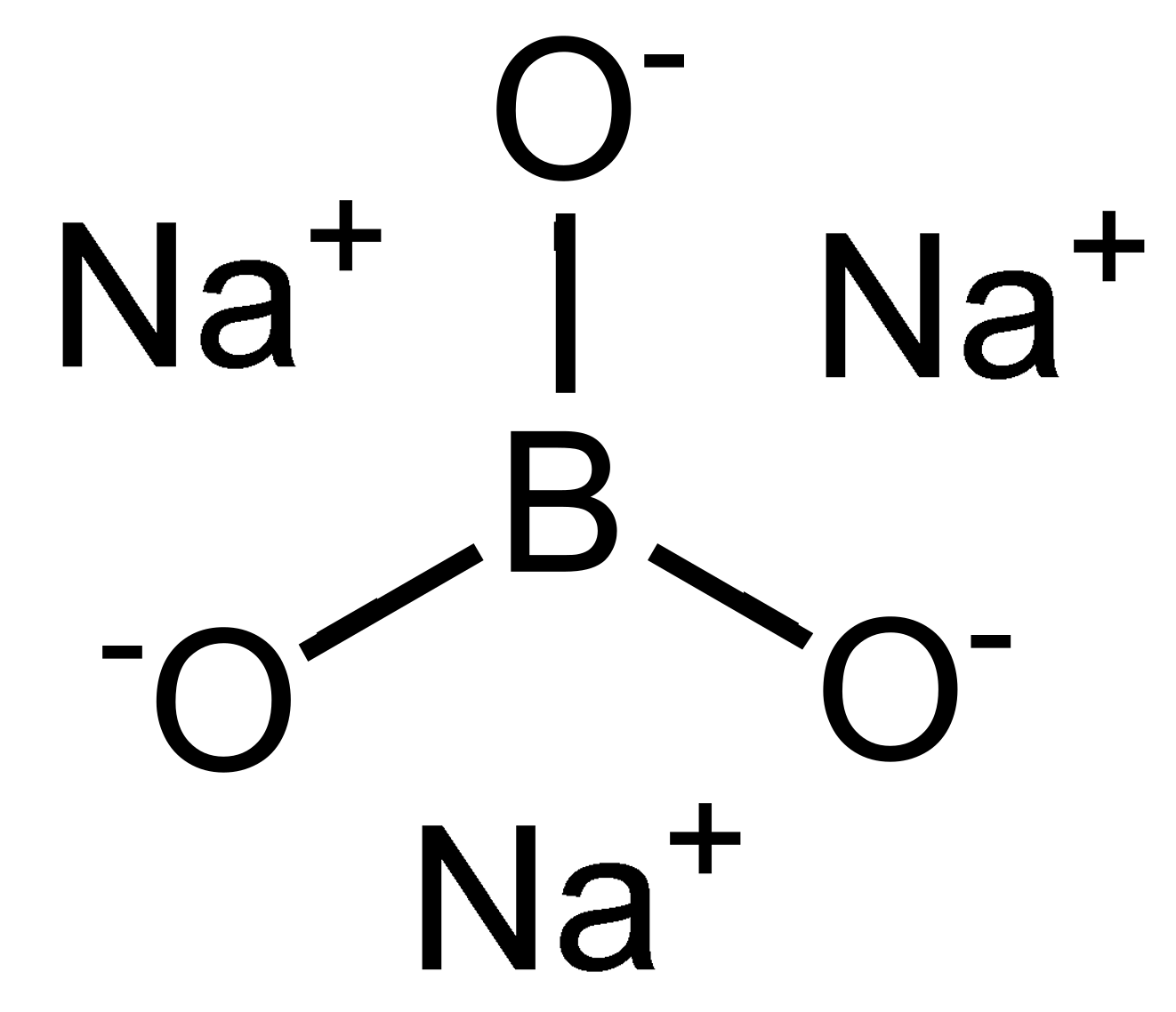

Names
- IUPAC name Trisodium orthoborate
- Other names: Sodium, boric acid salt; Sodium orthoborate; Sodium borate

Identifiers
CAS Number	14312-40-4
3D model (JSmol)	Interactive image
ChEMBL	ChEMBL38909
ChemSpider	140167
Gmelin Reference	117865
PubChem CID	159383
CompTox Dashboard (EPA)	DTXSID1049776
- InChI: InChI=1S/BO3.3Na/c2-1(3)4;;;/q-3;3*+1 Key: BSVBQGMMJUBVOD-UHFFFAOYSA-N
- SMILES: B([O-])([O-])[O-].[Na+].[Na+].[Na+]

Properties
Chemical formula	Na_{3}BO_{3}
Molar mass	127.78 g·mol^{−1}
Density	1.73 g/cm^{3}
Melting point	75 °C (167 °F; 348 K)
Boiling point	320 °C (608 °F; 593 K)

Hazards
- GHS labelling
Pictograms	(GHS07: Exclamation mark) (GHS08: Health hazard)
Signal word	Warning
Hazard statements	H319, H360, H361d, H412
Precautionary statements	P203, P264+P265, P273, P280, P305+P351+P338, P318, P337+P317, P405, P501

Related compounds
Related compounds	Borax; Sodium pentaborate; Disodium octaborate; Disodium enneaborate; Sodium metaborate
- Except where otherwise noted, data are given for materials in their standard state (at 25 °C [77 °F], 100 kPa). Infobox references

Trisodium borate is a chemical compound of sodium, boron, and oxygen, with formula Na_{3}BO_{3}, or (Na^{+})_{3}[BO_{3}]^{3−}. It is a sodium salt of the orthoboric acid B(OH)_{3}.

The compound is also called trisodium orthoborate, sodium orthoborate, or just sodium borate. However, "sodium orthoborate" has been used also for a compound with formula Na_{4}B_{2}O_{5}, which would correspond to an equimolar mixture of sodium metaborate NaBO_{2} and trisodium borate proper. and "sodium borate" is sometimes used in the generic sense, for a sodium salt with any of several other borate anions.

== Preparation ==
Sodium carbonate Na_{2}CO_{3} will react with sodium metaborate NaBO_{2} or boric oxide B_{2}O_{3} to form the orthoborate and carbon dioxide when heated between 600 and 850 °C:

NaBO_{2} + Na_{2}CO_{3} → Na_{3}BO_{3} + CO_{2}

Difficult to obtain in pure form from melts.

== Reactions ==
When dissolved in water, the orthoborate anion partially hydrolyzes into metaborate [BO_{2}]^{−} and hydroxide OH^{−}:

[BO_{3}]^{3−} + H_{2}O ⇌ [BO_{2}]^{−} + 2 OH^{−}

Electrolysis of a solution of sodium orthoborate generates sodium perborate at the anode.
