= Sodium metaborate =

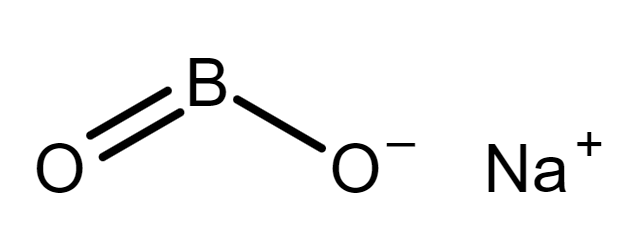
- Sodium metaborate monomer

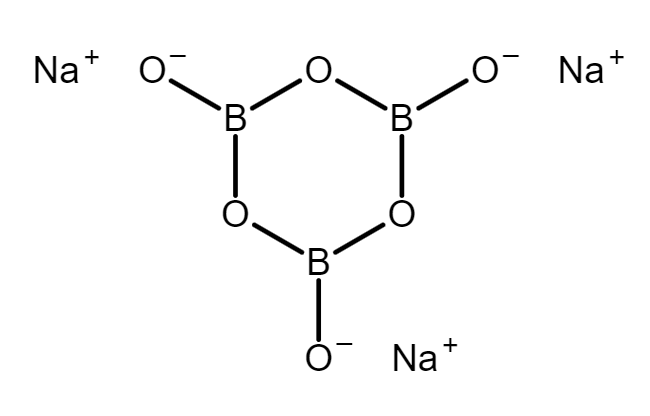
- Sodium metaborate trimer

Names
- IUPAC name Sodium metaborate

Identifiers
| CAS Number | 7775-19-1 |
| 3D model (JSmol) | Interactive image |
| ChEBI | CHEBI:75227 |
| ChemSpider | 22899 |
| ECHA InfoCard | 100.028.992 |
| EC Number | 231-891-6 |
| PubChem CID | 145326 |
| RTECS number | ED4640000 |
| UNII | Z6Q395A23R |
| CompTox Dashboard (EPA) | DTXSID2034386 |
- InChI: InChI=1S/BO2.Na/c2-1-3;/q-1;+1 Key: NVIFVTYDZMXWGX-UHFFFAOYSA-N
- SMILES: B(=O)[O-].[Na+]

Properties
| Chemical formula | NaBO_{2} |
| Molar mass | 65.80 g·mol^{−1} |
| Appearance | Colorless crystals |
| Odor | Odorless |
| Density | 2.464 g/cm^{3} (anhydrous) |
| Melting point | 966 °C (1,771 °F; 1,239 K) |
| Boiling point | 1,434 °C (2,613 °F; 1,707 K) |
| Solubility in water | 16.4 g/(100 mL) (0 °C); 28.2 g/(100 mL) (25 °C); 125.2 g/(100 mL) (100 °C) |
| Solubility | insoluble in ether, ethanol |

Structure
| Crystal structure | trigonal |

Thermochemistry
| Heat capacity (C) | 65.94 J/(mol·K) |
| Std molar entropy (S^{⦵}_{298}) | 73.39 J/(mol·K) |
| Std enthalpy of formation (Δ_{f}H^{⦵}_{298}) | −1059 kJ/mol |

Hazards
- Lethal dose or concentration (LD, LC)
| LD_{50} (median dose) | 2330 mg/kg (rat, oral) |
- Except where otherwise noted, data are given for materials in their standard state (at 25 °C [77 °F], 100 kPa). Infobox references

Sodium metaborate is a chemical compound of sodium, boron, and oxygen with formula NaBO_{2}. However, the metaborate ion is trimeric in the anhydrous solid, therefore a more correct formula is Na_{3}B_{3}O_{6} or (Na^{+})_{3}[B_{3}O_{6}]^{3−}. The formula can be written also as Na_{2}O·B_{2}O_{3} to highlight the relation to the main oxides of sodium and boron. The name is also applied to several hydrates whose formulas can be written NaBO_{2}·nH_{2}O for various values of n.

The anhydrous and hydrates are colorless crystalline solids. The anhydrous form is hygroscopic.

== Hydrates and solubility ==
The following hydrates crystallize from solutions of the proper composition in various temperature ranges:

- tetrahydrate NaBO_{2}·4H_{2}O from −6 to 53.6 °C
- dihydrate NaBO_{2}·2H_{2}O from 53.6 °C to 105 °C
- hemihydrate NaBO_{2}·0.5H_{2}O from 105 °C to the boiling point.

Early reports of a monohydrate NaBO_{2}·H_{2}O have not been confirmed.

== Structure ==
=== Anhydrous ===
Solid anhydrous sodium metaborate has the hexagonal crystal system with space group $R\bar3 c$. It actually contains a six-membered rings with the formula [B_{3}O_{6}]^{3−}, consisting of alternating boron and oxygen atoms with one negatively charged extra oxygen atom attached to each boron atom. All nine atoms lie on a plane. The six oxygen atoms are evenly divided into two distinct structural sites, with different B–O bond lengths: B–O(external) 128.0 pm and B–O(bridge) 143.3 pm. The density is 2.348 ± 0.005 g/cm^{3}. The approximate dimensions of the hexagonal cell are a = 1275 pm, c = 733 pm. However, the true unit cell is rhombohedral and has dimensions: a_{r}= 776 pm, α = 110.6°, Z = 6 (5.98) molecules KB0

=== Dihydrate ===
The dihydrate NaBO_{2}·2H_{2}O crystallizes in the triclinic crystal system, but is nearly monoclinic, with both α and γ very close to 90°. The cell parameters are a = 678 pm , b = 1058A pm, c = 588 pm, α = 91.5°, β = 22.5°, γ = 89°, Z = 4, density 1.905 g/cm^{3}. The refractive indices at 25°C and wavelength 589.3 nm are α = 1.439, β = 1.473, γ = 1.484. The dispersion is strong, greater at red than at violet.

The transition temperature between the dihydrate and the hemihydrate is 54 °C. However, the crystalline dihydrate will remain metastable until 106 °C to 110 °C, and change slowly above that temperature.

A compound with an identical empirical formula but a distinct molecular and crystal structure is sodium tetrahydroxyborate (NaB(OH)_{4}).

=== Vapor ===
Infrared spectroscopy of the vapor from anhydrous sodium metaborate, heated to between 900 °C and 1400 °C, shows mostly isolated clusters with formula NaBO_{2}, and some dimers thereof. Electron diffraction studies by Akishin and Spiridonov showed a structure O=B−O−Na with linear anion O=B−O^{−} and angle B−O−Na of 90-110°. The atomic distances are O=B: 120 pm, B−O: 136 pm,O−Na: 214 pm

== Preparation ==
Sodium metaborate is prepared by the fusion of sodium carbonate and boron oxide B_{2}O_{3} or borax Na_{2}B_{4}O_{7}. Another way to create the compound is by the fusion of borax with sodium hydroxide at 700 °C:

B_{2}O_{3} + 2 NaOH → 2 NaBO_{2} + H_{2}O

The boiling point of sodium metaborate (1434 °C) is lower than that of boron oxide (1860 °C) and borax (1575 °C) In fact, while the metaborate boils without change of composition, borax gives off a vapor of sodium metaborate with a small excess of sodium oxide Na_{2}O.

The anhydrous salt can also be prepared from the tetraborate by heating to 270 °C in vacuum.

Although not performed industrially, hydrolysis of sodium borohydride Na[BH_{4}] with a suitable catalyst gives sodium metaborate and hydrogen gas:

Na[BH_{4}] + 2 H_{2}O → NaBO_{2} + 4 H_{2} (ΔH = −217 kJ/mol)

== Reactions ==
=== With water ===
When sodium metaborate is dissolved in water, the anion combines with two water molecules to form the tetrahydroxyborate anion [B(OH)_{4}]^{−}.

=== Electrochemical conversion to borax ===
Electrolysis of a concentrated aqueous solution of 20% NaBO_{2}·4H_{2}O with an anion exchange membrane and inert anode (such as gold, palladium, or boron-doped diamond) converts the metaborate anion to tetraborate B_{4}O^{2−}_{7}, and the sodium salt of the later (borax) precipitates as a white powder.

8 BO^{−}_{2} → 2 B_{4}O^{2−}_{7} + O_{2} + 4 e^{−}

=== Reduction to sodium borohydride ===
Sodium metaborate can be converted to sodium borohydride by several methods, including the reaction with various reducing agents at high temperatures and pressure, or with magnesium hydride MgH_{2} by ball milling at room temperature, followed by extraction of the Na[BH_{4}] with isopropylamine.

NaBO_{2} + 2 MgH_{2} → Na[BH_{4}] + 2 MgO

Another method is the electrolytic reduction of a concentrated sodium metaborate solution, namely

BO^{−}_{2} + 6 H_{2}O + 8 e^{−} → [BH_{4}]^{−} + 8 OH^{−}

However, this method is not efficient since it competes with the reduction of hydroxide:

4 OH^{−} → 2 H_{2}O + O_{2} + 4 e^{−}

Nanofiltration membranes can effectively separate the borohydride from the metaborate.

=== Reaction with alcohols ===
Anhydrous sodium metaborate refluxed with methanol yields the corresponding sodium tetramethoxyborate (melting point: 253-258 °C, CAS number: 18024-69-6):

Na^{+}BO^{−}_{2} + 4 CH_{3}OH → Na^{+}[B(OCH_{3})_{4}]^{−} + 2 H_{2}O

The analogous reaction with ethanol yields the sodium tetraethoxyborate.

== Uses ==
Current and proposed applications of sodium metaborate include:

- Manufacture of borosilicate glasses, which are resistant to uneven or fast heating because of their small coefficient of thermal expansion.
- Composition of herbicides.
- Raising the pH of injected fluids for oil extraction.

== See also ==
- Borate
