= Sodium tetrahydroxyborate =

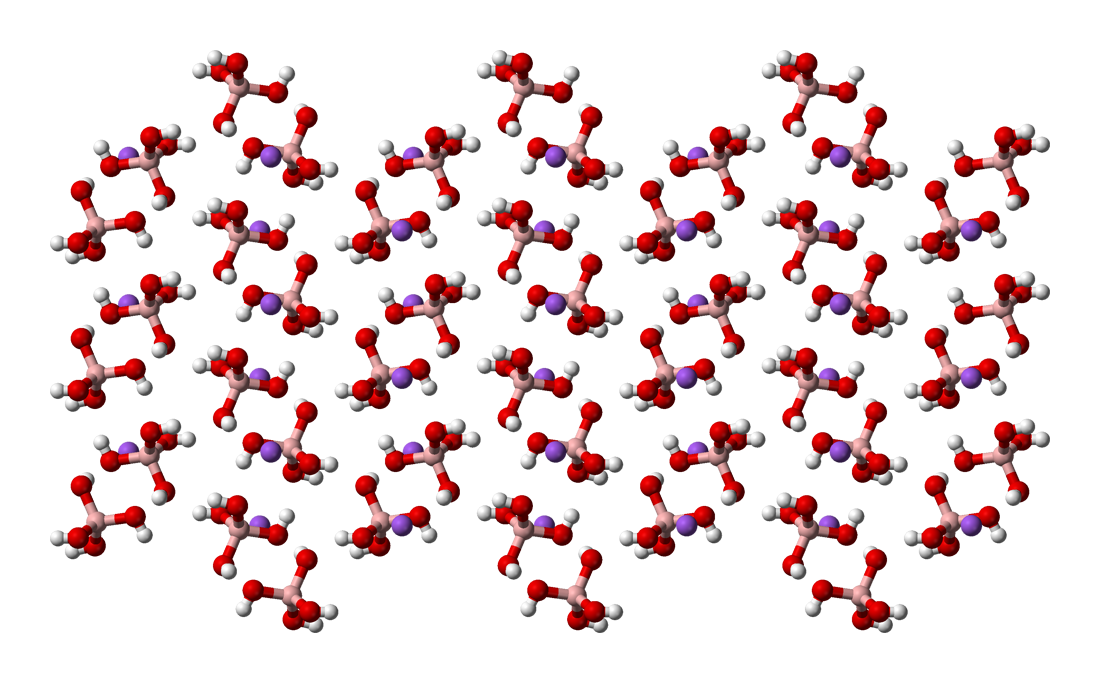

Names
- Other names: Sodium tetrahydroxidoborate(1−); Sodium tetrahydroxyboranuide

Identifiers
3D model (JSmol)	Interactive image
ChemSpider	25947159
PubChem CID	23662119
- InChI: InChI=1S/BH4O4.Na/c2-1(3,4)5;/h2-5H;/q-1;+1 Key: STVZSUXCUPXWTA-UHFFFAOYSA-N
- SMILES: [B-](O)(O)(O)O.[Na+]

Properties
Chemical formula	Na[B(OH)_{4}]
Molar mass	101.83 g·mol^{−1}
Appearance	Colorless crystalline solid
Density	1.903 g/cm^{3} (monoclinic), 2.029 g/cm^{3} (orthorhombic)
- Except where otherwise noted, data are given for materials in their standard state (at 25 °C [77 °F], 100 kPa). Infobox references

Sodium tetrahydroxyborate is a salt (ionic compound) with chemical formula NaH_{4}BO_{4} or Na^{+}[B(OH)_{4}]^{−}. It is one of several sodium borates. At room temperature it is a colorless crystalline solid.

The element ratio corresponds to the oxide mixture Na_{2}O·B_{2}O_{3}·4H_{2}O, but the structure of the solid is quite different from that suggested by this formula.

== Structure ==
Sodium tetrahydroxyborate has been crystallized from aqueous solutions in two anhydrous forms. Both contain the tetrahedral tetrahydroxyborate anion, which is formed from (ortho)boric acid B(OH)_{3} in water solutions by binding an hydroxide anion ^{−}OH instead of loss of a proton H^{+}. These anions lie in layers perpendicular to the (010) plane, and form a tridimensional lattice held together by hydrogen bonds between the hydrogen atoms in each anion and the oxygen atoms in adjacent anions.

=== Monoclinic form ===
The first form, described in 1993, crystallizes in the monoclinic crystal system with symmetry group P2_{1}/a and parameters a = 588.6 pm, b = 1056.6 pm, c = 614.6 pm, β = 111.6°, formulas per cell Z = 4, cell volume V = 0.3554 nm^{3}.

In the monoclinic form the tetrahydroxyborate anions within each anion layer have alternating orientations, related by central inversion. Three of the oxygen atoms in each anion lie at most 4.2 pm away from a (010) plane, and the fourth is about 270 pm away from that plane. The sodium cations lie approximately on the same anion layers, 34 pm away from the layer's midplane. Each sodium ion is surrounded by five oxygen atoms in an approximate square pyramidal arrangement, at distances of 233 to 239 pm, with a sixth oxygen at 313 pm. These six oxygens belong to four anions.

=== Orthorhombic form ===
The second form, described in 2009, crystallizes in the orthorhombic crystal system with group P2_{1}2_{1}2_{1} and cell parameters a = 532.3 pm, b = 949.6 pm, and c = 659.6 pm, Z = 4, volume V = 0.3334 nm^{3}

In this version, all anions inside each (010) anion layer have one of the four B−O bonds oriented in the same direction, approximately parallel to the (100) axis, opposite to that of the anions in the adjacent layers. Three oxygen atoms of each anion lie at most 4 pm away from their mean (100) plane. The anions form columns parallel to the (100) direction, with each column rotated by 180 degrees about that axis relative to the adjacent ones. The layer spacing is 224 pm.

The sodium atoms are located in layers halfway between the anion layers. Each sodium ion is surrounded by five oxygen atoms, in a square pyramid arrangement, at distances between 233 and 239 pm. The oxygen atoms at the base are displaced at most 4 pm from their mean plane, the sodium atom is displaced from it by 30 pm, and the fifth oxygen is 270 pm from it.

== Synthesis and properties ==
The monoclinic form has been crystallized by mixing sodium hydroxide NaOH 14.5% (weight), boric acid H_{3}BO_{3} 9.0%, calcium hydroxide Ca(OH)_{2} 10.7%, and water 65.8% and letting it stand for a long time at 293 K.

The orthorhombic form has been crystallized, as thin needles, from a solution of sodium hydroxide and boric acid at pH 12 (which meant a boron to sodium mole ratio of 3:2 in the solution), left to evaporate at room temperature.

The starting solution for evaporative crystallization can be prepared also from sodium metaborate tetrahydrate NaBO_{2}·4H_{2}O.

The solid is fairly stable but slowly reacts with carbon dioxide CO_{2} from air.

The crystallization process has been studied by Raman spectroscopy of nanometre-size droplets of solution as the water evaporates in air.

Sodium tetrahydroxyborate is end product of the hydrolysis of sodium borohydride Na[BH_{4}] at 45–65 °C, through the formation of neutral borane BH_{3} and then boric acid B(OH)_{3}.
