= Tetraborate =

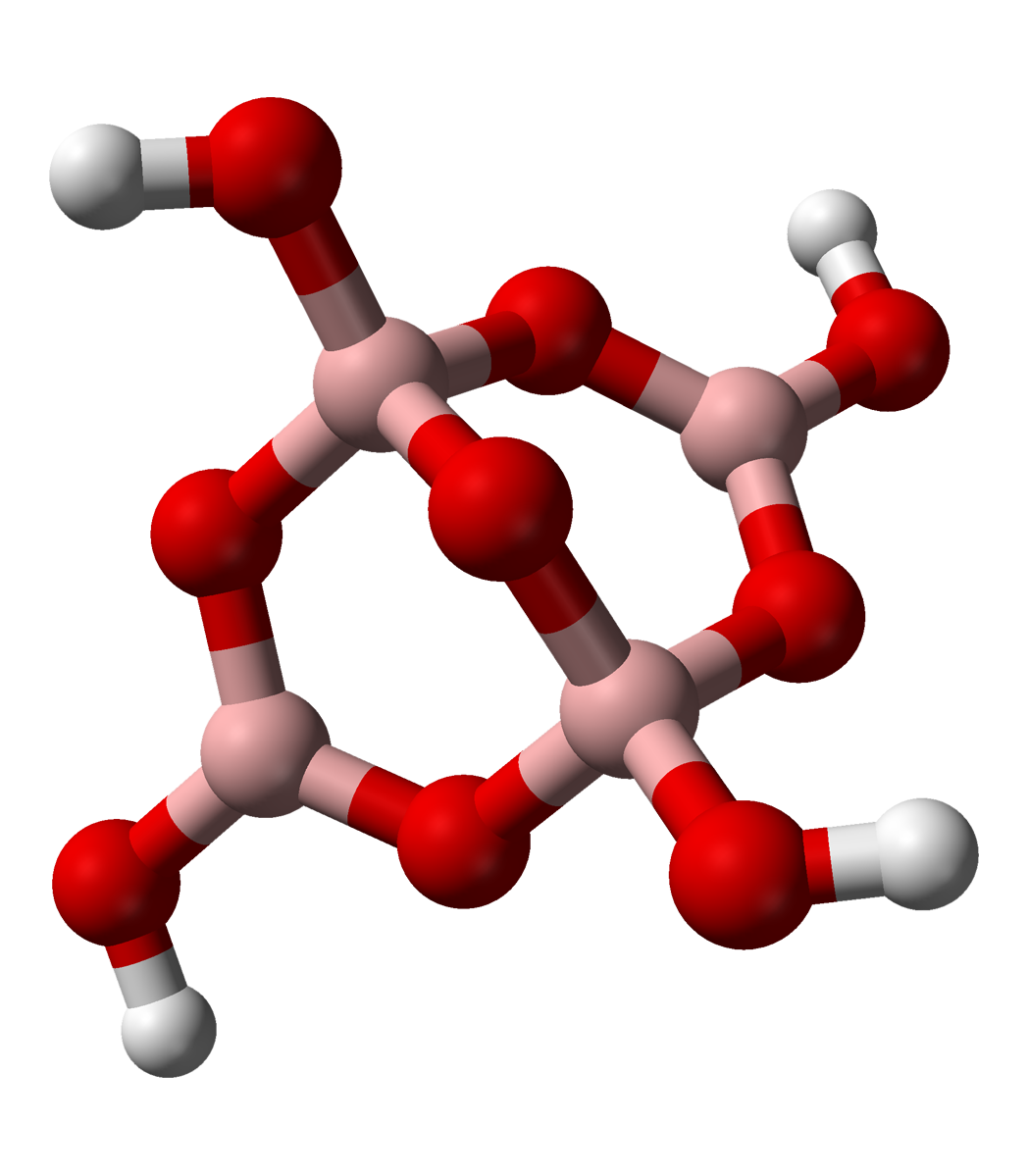
Structure of the hydrated tetraborate (borax) ion, [B_{4}O_{5}(OH)_{4}]^{2−}.

In chemistry, tetraborate or pyroborate is an anion (negative ion) with formula B_{4}O^{2−}_{7}; or a salt containing that anion, such as sodium tetraborate, Na_{2}B_{4}O_{7}. It is one of the boron oxoacids, that is, a borate.

The name is also applied to the hydrated ion [B_{4}O_{5}(OH)_{4}]^{2−} as present in borax

The ion occurs in boric acid solutions at neutral pH, being formed by condensation of orthoborate and tetrahydroxyborate anions:

2 B(OH)_{3} + 2 [B(OH)_{4}]^{−} ⇌ [B_{4}O_{5}(OH)_{4}]^{−}_{2} + 5 H_{2}O

The tetraborate anion (tetramer) includes two tetrahedral and two trigonal boron atoms symmetrically assembled in a fused bicyclic structure. The two tetrahedral boron atoms are linked together by a common oxygen atom, and each also bears a negative net charge brought by the supplementary OH^{−} groups laterally attached to them. This intricate molecular anion also exhibits three rings: two fused distorted hexagonal (boroxole) rings and one distorted octagonal ring. Each ring is made of a succession of alternate boron and oxygen atoms. Boroxole rings are a very common structural motif in polyborate ions.

The hydrated tetraborate anion occurs in the mineral borax (sodium tetraborate octahydrate) with the formula Na_{2}[B_{4}O_{5}(OH)_{4}]·8H_{2}O. The borax chemical formula is also commonly written in a more compact notation as Na_{2}B_{4}O_{7}·10H_{2}O. Sodium borate can be obtained in high purity and so can be used to make a standard solution in titrimetric analysis.
