= Lithium metaborate =

Names
- Other names boric acid, lithium salt

Identifiers
CAS Number	13453-69-5
3D model (JSmol)	Interactive image
ChemSpider	109911
ECHA InfoCard	100.033.287
EC Number	236-631-5
PubChem CID	123308
CompTox Dashboard (EPA)	DTXSID50894850
- InChI: InChI=1S/BO2.Li/c2-1-3;/q-1;+1 Key: HZRMTWQRDMYLNW-UHFFFAOYSA-N; InChI=1/BO2.Li/c2-1-3;/q-1;+1 Key: HZRMTWQRDMYLNW-UHFFFAOYAF
- SMILES: [Li+].[O-]B=O

Properties
Chemical formula	LiBO_{2}
Molar mass	49.751 g/mol
Appearance	white hygroscopic monoclinic crystals
Density	2.223 g/cm^{3}
Melting point	849 °C (1,560 °F; 1,122 K)
Solubility in water	0.89 g/100 mL (0 °C); 2.57 g/100 mL (20 °C); 11.8 g/100 mL (80 °C)
Solubility	soluble in ethanol

Thermochemistry
Heat capacity (C)	59.8 J/mol K
Std molar entropy (S^{⦵}_{298})	51.3 J/mol K
Std enthalpy of formation (Δ_{f}H^{⦵}_{298})	−1022 kJ/mol
Std enthalpy of combustion (Δ_{c}H^{⦵}_{298})	33.9 kJ/mol

Hazards
NFPA 704 (fire diamond)	2 0 0
Safety data sheet (SDS)	External MSDS
- Except where otherwise noted, data are given for materials in their standard state (at 25 °C [77 °F], 100 kPa). verify (what is ?) Infobox references

Lithium metaborate is a chemical compound of lithium, boron, and oxygen with elemental formula LiBO_{2}. It is often encountered as a hydrate, LiBO_{2}·nH_{2}O, where n is usually 2 or 4. However, these formulas do not describe the actual structure of the solids.

Lithium metaborate is one of the borates, a large family of salts (ionic compounds) with anions consisting of boron, oxygen, and hydrogen.

== Structure ==
Lithium metaborate has several crystal forms.

The α form consists of infinite chains of trigonal planar metaborate anions [BO_{2}O^{−}]n.

The γ form is stable at 15 kbar and 950 °C. It has a polymeric cation consisting of a tridimensional regular array of [B(O−)_{4}]^{−} tetrahedra sharing oxygen vertices, alernating with lithium cations, each also surrounded by four oxygen atoms. The B-O distances are 148.3 pm, the Li-O distances are 196 pm.

Lithium metaborate forms glass relatively easily, and consists of approximately 40% tetrahedral borate anions, and 60% trigonal planar boron. The ratio of tetrahedral to trigonal boron has been shown to be strongly temperature dependent in the liquid and supercooled liquid state.

== Applications ==
=== Laboratory ===
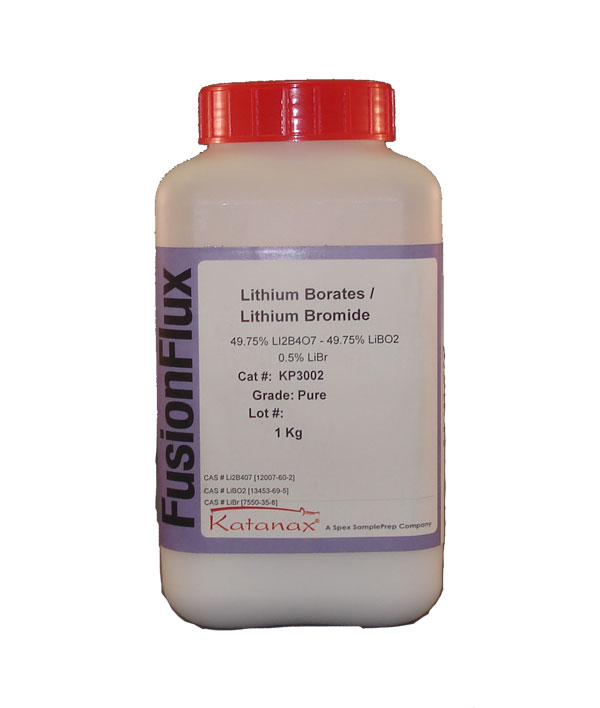
Fusion flux consisting of lithium metaborate and lithium teraborate, with a small amount of lithium bromide.

Molten lithium metaborate, often mixed with lithium tetraborate Li_{2}B_{4}O_{7}, is used to dissolve oxide samples for analysis by XRF, AAS, ICP-OES, ICP-AES, and ICP-MS, modern versions of classical bead test. The process may be used also to facilitate the dissolution of oxides in acids for wet analysis. Small amounts of lithium bromide LiBr or lithium iodide LiI may be added as mold and crucible release agents.

Lithium metaborate dissolves acidic oxides Me_{x}O_{y} with x < y, such as SiO_{2}, Al_{2}O_{3}, SO_{3}, P_{2}O_{5}, TiO_{2}, Sb_{2}O_{3}, V_{2}O_{5}, WO_{3}, and Fe_{2}O_{3}. Lithium tetraborate, on the other hand, dissolves basic oxides with x > y, such as CaO, MgO and other oxides of the alkali metals and alkaline earth metals. Most oxides are best dissolved in a mixture of the two lithium borate salts, for spectrochemical analysis.
