= Trisodium pentaborate =

Identifiers
3D model (JSmol)	Interactive image
- InChI: InChI=1S/B5H4O10.3Na.H2O/c6-2-10-1-11-5(13-2)14-3(7)12-4(8,9)15-5;;;;/h8-9H,1H2;;;;1H2/q-2;;;; Key: GCZJYHCEEQCBQM-UHFFFAOYSA-N
- SMILES: [Na].[Na].[Na].O1B([O-])O[B+](O)(O)OB12OB([O-])O[B-]O2.O

Properties
Chemical formula	B_{5}H_{2}Na_{3}O_{10}
Molar mass	285.03 g·mol^{−1}
Appearance	Transparent crystal
Solubility in water	Soluble

Structure
Crystal structure	Orthorhombic

Related compounds
Related compounds	probertite, heidornite, garrelsite
- Except where otherwise noted, data are given for materials in their standard state (at 25 °C [77 °F], 100 kPa). Infobox references

Trisodium pentaborate is a salt that can form as a monohydrate with formula Na_{3}B_{5}O_{8}(OH)_{2}·H_{2}O, which contains the anion dihydroxydopentaborate [B_{5}O_{8}(OH)_{2}]^{3−}.

Its formula may be incorrectly given as Na_{3}B_{5}O_{8}·2H_{2}O, or as 3Na_{2}O_{5}B_{2}O_{3}·4H_{2}O. It may also be called simply sodium pentaborate, but this name is more properly reserved for the compound with elemental formula Na_{2}O·5B_{2}O_{3}·nH_{2}O.

== Structure ==
Trisodium pentaborate monohydrate crystallizes as thin plates in the orthorhombic crystal system, with symmetry group Pbca and cell parameters a = 880.4 pm, b = 1837.1 pm, c = 1092.4 pm, formulas per cell Z = 8.
