= Mereheadite =

General
- Category: Halide
- Formula: Pb_{47}Cl_{25}(OH)_{13}O_{24}(CO_{3})(BO_{3})_{2}
- IMA symbol: Mrh
- Strunz classification: 3.DC.45
- Crystal system: Monoclinic
- Crystal class: Prismatic (2/m) (same H-M symbol)
- Space group: C2/c
- Unit cell: a = 17.372(1) Å, b = 27.9419(19) Å, c = 10.6661(6) Å; β = 93.152(5)°; Z = 2

Identification
- Color: Pale yellow
- Mohs scale hardness: 3 1/2
- Luster: Vitreous, resinous
- Streak: White
- Optical properties: Biaxial
- Refractive index: n_{α} = 2.190 n_{γ} = 2.280
- Birefringence: δ = 0.090

Mereheadite is a rare oxychloride that can be found with Mendipite at Merehead quarry, Cranmore, Somerset, in the United Kingdom. Most specimens are associated with calcite, mendipite or hydrous cerussite in the Manganese pods on vein two at torr works quarry (merehead quarry). This mineral is associated with symesite which is also light yellow to orange. Symesite is found in small blotches on the calcites or mendipites; Mereheadite does not, as it is most often found in veins.
