= Victor Pavlovich Spiridonov =

Russian chemist

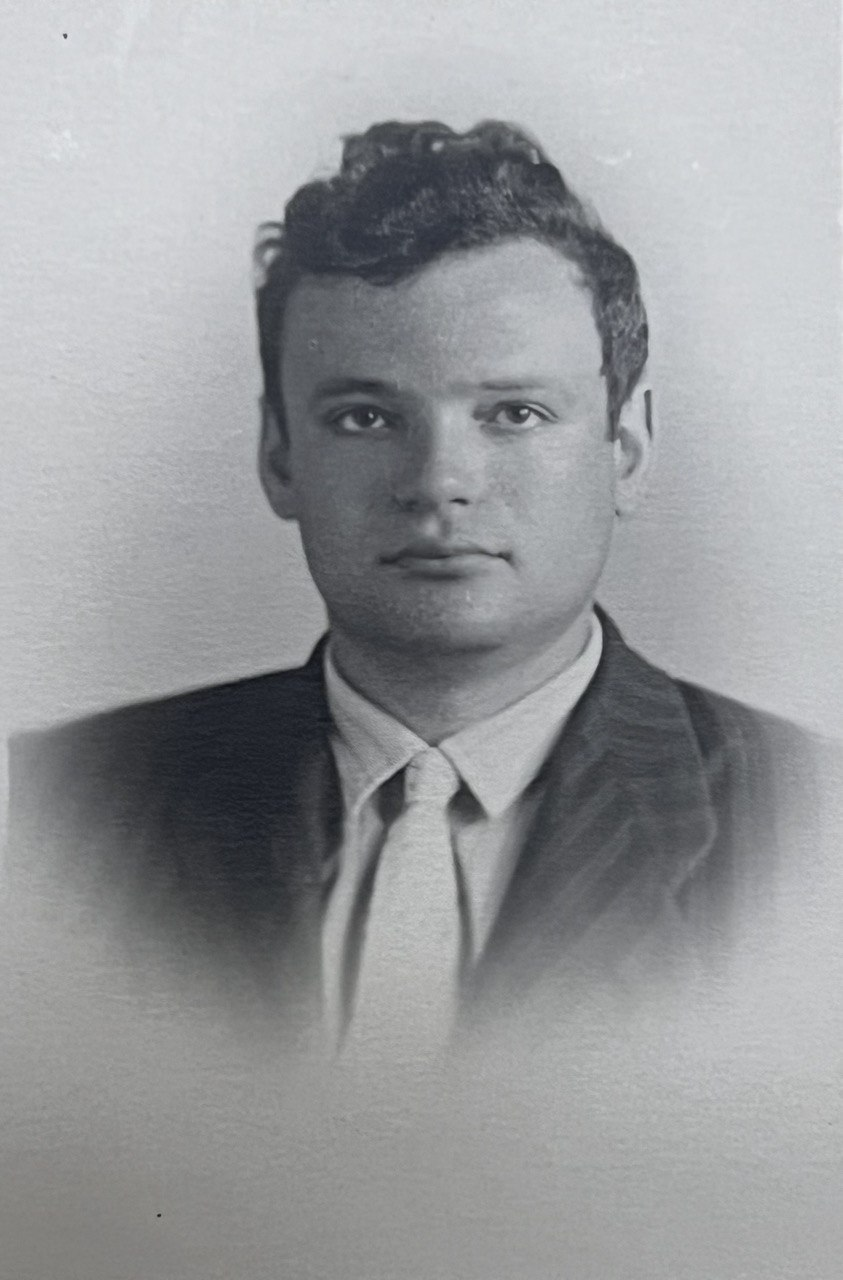
- Victor Spiridonov in 1964
- Born: 20 June 1931; Moscow, USSR
- Died: 30 March 2001; Moscow, Russia
- Citizenship: USSR>Russian Federation
- Education: Moscow State University
- Awards: Medal "For Labour Valour"; USSR State Prize
- Scientific career
- Fields: structural chemistry
- Workplaces: MSU Faculty of Chemistry

Victor Pavlovich Spiridonov (20 June 1931 – 30 March 2001) was a Soviet and Russian physical chemist and a specialist in the gas electron diffraction method. He was awarded the USSR State Prize in 1973.

== Biography ==
Victor P. Spiridonov was born in Moscow on 20 June 1931. With the start of the Great Patriotic War in 1941 he was evacuated to Saratov, where he lived until 1944. Upon returning to Moscow he continued school, finished it in 1949 and started education at the Moscow State University Faculty of Chemistry the same year.

He graduated with merit in 1954 and immediately started to work in the Laboratory of Gas Electron Diffraction Analysis at the Division of Physical Chemistry as a junior researcher. In 1958 he received a Candidate of Science degree in Chemistry (the topic of his PhD thesis was "The study of halogenides of the elements of the second group of the Periodic table of elements via gas electron diffraction method"). In 1959 and 1962 he traveled to Yugoslavia and Poland respectively during scientific and tourist trips. In 1963 he became a senior researcher, and from 1969 he earned the degree of Doctor of Science in Chemistry (the theme of his Doctoral thesis was "The study of inorganic compounds via gas electron diffraction method and some patterns in their structure").

Between 1971 and 2001 Spiridonov was a professor in the division of Physical Chemistry, and headed the Laboratory of Electron Diffraction Analysis at MSU Faculty of Chemistry (1964–2001).

He died in 2001 and is buried in the Donskoye Cemetery in Moscow.

== Research ==
The fields of scientific interest of Victor Spiridonov were the theory of molecular structure and dynamics, quantum chemistry and the structure of molecules of inorganic compounds. He was one of the first graduates of the first Soviet Gas electron diffraction laboratory. Victor Spiridonov continued the mission of his teacher Petre Alekseevich Akishin (the founder of the Moscow gas electron diffraction school) and determined the structure of many inorganic compounds in the gas phase.

Over the period from 1955 to 1975 Victor P. Spiridonov co-authored articles in scientific journals, such as Proceedings of the USSR Academy of Sciences, Journal of Physical Chemistry, Journal of Structural Chemistry, Crystallography Reports as well as in the series "Gas electron diffraction analysis of molecule structure": halogenides of zinc, cadmium, bivalent mercury, tin, lead, elements of the second group of Periodic table of elements, boron sulfide, boron oxide, non-volatile inorganic compounds. He was an author/coauthor of approximately 300 scientific papers.

He also worked as an University lecturer. In the MSU Faculty of Chemistry he taught courses "Mathematical processing of physical chemistry data" and "Molecular oscillations in electronography" within the course "Theoretical foundations of gas electron diffraction method". In collaboration with A. A. Lopatkin Victor P. Spiridonov wrote a course book "Mathematical processing of physical chemistry data". He was a head of educational and scientific departments in the magazine "Soviet chemist".

== Awards ==
- Awardee of USSR State Prize (1973) – as part of a team (N.G. Rambidi (head of department, Institute of High Temperatures AS USSR (IHT AS)), Yu.S. Ezhov (senior researcher, (IHT AS)); P.A. Akishin (senior researcher), E.Z. Zasorin (senior researcher), V.P. Spiridonov (head of laboratory, Lomonosov Moscow State University), M.I. Vinogradov (head of laboratory, Research Institute)) — for development of a new method of high-temperature gas electron diffraction and its use to study the properties of inorganic molecules at temperatures up to + 2,500°C.
- Medal "For Labour Valour" (1986).
- Prizes of Ministry of higher and secondary vocational education of the USSR and Mendeleev Chemical Society.
- Honorable diploma of The United Trade Union Committee of MSU (in commemoration of the 100th anniversary of Vladimir Lenin).

== Selected publications ==
- Spiridonov, V.P.; Gershikov, A.G.; Butayev, B.S. (January 1979). "Molecular structure and vibrational potential function of HgI2: electron diffraction study". Journal of Molecular Structure. 52: 53–62. doi:10.1016/0022-2860(79)80094-0.
- Spiridonov, V.P.; Ischenko, A.A.; Ivashkevich, L.S. (March 1981). "A new intensity equation for electron diffraction analysis: A barrier to pseudorotation in PF5 from diffraction data". Journal of Molecular Structure. 72: 153–164. doi:10.1016/0022-2860(81)85015-6.
- Spiridonov, V.P.; Gershikov, A.G.; Altman, A.B.; Romanov, G.V.; Ivanov, A.A. (January 1981). "A new approach to electron diffraction analysis of symmetric triatomic molecules with large-amplitude bending motion". Chemical Physics Letters. 77 (1): 41–44. doi:10.1016/0009-2614(81)85595-9.
- Ischenko, A. A.; Golubkov, V. V.; Spiridonov, V. P.; Zgurskii, A. V.; Akhmanov, A. S.; Vabischevich, M. G.; Bagratashvili, V. N. (November 1983). "A stroboscopical gas-electron diffraction method for the investigation of short-lived molecular species". Applied Physics B Photophysics and Laser Chemistry. 32 (3): 161–163. Bibcode:1983ApPhB..32..161I. doi:10.1007/BF00688823. ISSN 0721-7269.
- Nasarenko, A.Ya.; Spiridonov, V.P.; Butayev, B.S.; Zasorin, E.Z. (January 1985). "Second-order perturbation approach to anharmonic analysis of molecules by electron diffraction". Journal of Molecular Structure: THEOCHEM. 119 (3–4): 263–270. doi:10.1016/0166-1280(85)87004-4.
- Kochikov, I.V.; Kuramshina, G.M.; Spiridonov, V.P.; Tarasov, Yu.I.; Yagola, A.G. (2000), "Regularizing procedures for solving the general inverse problem of structural chemistry and their applications", Inverse Problems in Engineering Mechanics II, Elsevier, pp. 487–491, doi:10.1016/b978-008043693-7/50123-9, ISBN 978-0-08-043693-7
- Kochikov, I.V.; Tarasov, Yu.I.; Kuramshina, G.M.; Spiridonov, V.P.; Yagola, A.G.; Strand, T.G. (April 1998). "Regularizing algorithm for determination of equilibrium geometry and harmonic force field of free molecules from joint use of electron diffraction, vibrational spectroscopy and ab initio data with application to benzene". Journal of Molecular Structure. 445 (1–3): 243–258. Bibcode:1998JMoSt.445..243K. doi:10.1016/S0022-2860(97)00428-6.
- Kochikov, I.V.; Tarasov, Yu.I.; Spiridonov, V.P.; Kuramshina, G.M.; Yagola, A.G.; Saakjan, A.S.; Popik, M.V.; Samdal, S. (August 1999). "Extension of a regularizing algorithm for the determination of equilibrium geometry and force field of free molecules from joint use of electron diffraction, molecular spectroscopy and ab initio data on systems with large-amplitude oscillatory motion". Journal of Molecular Structure. 485–486 (1–3): 421–443. Bibcode:1999JMoSt.485..421K. doi:10.1016/S0022-2860(99)00185-4.
- Kochikov, I.V.; Tarasov, Yu.I.; Spiridonov, V.P.; Kuramshina, G.M.; Rankin, D.W.H.; Saakjan, A.S.; Yagola, A.G. (June 2001). "The equilibrium structure of thiophene by the combined use of electron diffraction, vibrational spectroscopy and microwave spectroscopy guided by theoretical calculations". Journal of Molecular Structure. 567–568 (2–3): 29–40. Bibcode:2001JMoSt.567...29K. doi:10.1016/S0022-2860(01)00539-7.
- Spiridonov, Victor P.; Vogt, Natalja; Vogt, Jürgen (October 2001). "Determination of Molecular Structure in Terms of Potential Energy Functions from Gas-Phase Electron Diffraction Supplemented by Other Experimental and Computational Data". Structural Chemistry. 12 (5): 349–376. Bibcode:2001StrCh..12..349S. doi:10.1023/A:1011908303949. ISSN 1040-0400.
- Kochikov, I.V.; Tarasov, Yu.I.; Vogt, N.; Spiridonov, V.P. (April 2002). "Large-amplitude motion in 1,4-cyclohexadiene and 1,4-dioxin: theoretical background for joint treatment of spectroscopic, electron diffraction and ab initio data". Journal of Molecular Structure. 607 (2–3): 163–174. Bibcode:2002JMoSt.607..163K. doi:10.1016/S0022-2860(01)00914-0.
