= Disodium octaborate =

- Repeating asymmetrical unit in α-Na_{2}B_{8}O_{13}

Names
- IUPAC name Disodium;(9,11-dioxido-5-oxoboranyloxy-2,4,6,8,10,12,13-heptaoxa-1,3,5,7,9,11-hexaborabicyclo[5.5.1]tridecan-3-yl)oxy-oxoborane
- Other names Sodium octaborate

Identifiers
CAS Number	12008-41-2
3D model (JSmol)	Interactive image
ECHA InfoCard	100.114.740
EC Number	234-541-0
PubChem CID	90479350
UNII	JT9XWY98MF
CompTox Dashboard (EPA)	DTXSID1034391
- InChI: InChI=1S/B8O13.2Na/c9-1-13-5-18-6(14-2-10)20-8-17-4(12)15-3(11)16-7(19-5)21-8;;/q-2;2*+1 Key: CGCGPGRQKOPVHP-UHFFFAOYSA-N
- SMILES: B(=O)OB1OB2OB(OB(OB(O2)OB(O1)OB=O)[O-])[O-].[Na+].[Na+]

Properties
Chemical formula	Na_{2}B_{8}O_{13}
Molar mass	340.45 g·mol^{−1}
Appearance	Colorless crystals
Solubility in water	9.5 g/(100 g)
- Except where otherwise noted, data are given for materials in their standard state (at 25 °C [77 °F], 100 kPa). Infobox references

Disodium octaborate tetrahydrate
Names
- Other names: Aquabor; Boron sodium oxide; Polybor; Sodium octaborate; Tim-bor insecticide

Identifiers
CAS Number	12280-03-4
3D model (JSmol)	Interactive image
ECHA InfoCard	100.114.740
EC Number	602-894-3
PubChem CID	90478478
UNII	U2EEC8170G
CompTox Dashboard (EPA)	DTXSID1034391
- InChI: InChI=1S/B8O13.2Na.4H2O/c9-1-13-5-18-6(14-2-10)20-8-17-4(12)15-3(11)16-7(19-5)21-8;;;;;;/h;;;4*1H2/q-2;2*+1;;;; Key: RDMZIKMKSGCBKK-UHFFFAOYSA-N
- SMILES: B(=O)OB1OB2OB(OB(OB(O2)OB(O1)OB=O)[O-])[O-].O.O.O.O.[Na+].[Na+]

Properties
Chemical formula	Na_{2}B_{8}O_{13}·4H_{2}O
Molar mass	412.5270 g/mol
Appearance	white powder
- Except where otherwise noted, data are given for materials in their standard state (at 25 °C [77 °F], 100 kPa). verify (what is ?) Infobox references

Disodium octaborate is a borate of sodium, a chemical compound of sodium, boron, and oxygen — a salt with elemental formula Na_{2}B_{8}O_{13} or (Na^{+})_{2}[B_{8}O_{13}]^{2−}, also written as Na_{2}O·4B_{2}O_{3}. It is a colorless crystalline solid, soluble in water.

Disodium octaborate is traded either as a liquid concentrate, or as the tetrahydrate Na_{2}B_{8}O_{13}·4H_{2}O, a white odorless powder. It is used as an insecticide, and as a fungicide and algicide, and as a fire retardant., and as a boron micronutrient additive in fertilizers. Trade names include Bora-Care, Borathor, Termite Prufe, Board Defense, Polybor, Tim-bor,Mr Dotty 008, and Can-Bor.

== Preparation ==
The anhydrous form can be crystallized from a molten mixture of sodium oxide Na_{2}O and boric oxide B_{2}O_{3}.

== Properties ==
=== Solubility ===
The salt dissolves in water to form viscous supersaturated solutions at elevated temperatures. Solubility of the tetrahydrate is 21.9% (wt) at 30 °C (303 K).

=== Structure ===
The anhydrous salt exists in two stable crystalline forms, α and β.

The α form has monoclinic crystal structure, with the P2_{1/a} space group. The unit cell parameters at 273 K are: a = 650.7 pm, b = 1779 pm, c = 837.7 pm, β = 96.6 °, Z = 4. The structure contains two interlocking boron-oxygen frameworks, each of them consisting of alternating single and double rings composed of two triangles and a tetrahedron, the so called triborate and pentaborate groups. The two frameworks are connected by two (non-equivalent) sodium atoms, each surrounded by 8 oxygens, comprising finite chains of four NaO_{8} polyhedra with shared edges. The thermal expansion is sharply anisotropic, including negative thermal expansion. The thermal expansion tensor in 273–1000 K in function of absolute temperature T has α_{11} = 55–0.042T, α_{22} = 11, α_{33} = -15 + 0.032T (×10–6) K^{−1}, μ = (c^α_{33}) = 42°.

The β form has monoclinic crystal structure, with the P2_{1/c} space group. The unit cell parameters are a = 1173.1 pm, b = 788.0 pm, c = 1041.0 pm, β = 99.883 °, Z = 4. The structure consists of two infinite, independent, and interleaved boron–oxygen networks containing a complex borate anion [B_{8}O_{13}]^{2−} formed by six BO_{3} triangles (Δ) and two BO_{4} tetrahedra (T), which can be viewed as a B_{5}O_{10} group linked to a B_{3}O_{7} group. This fundamental building block is identical to that of the α form and of silver octaborate Ag_{2}B_{8}O_{13}, with some subtle differences.

== Uses ==
Dilute solutions of disodium octaborate are sprayed on wood surfaces to kill termites, powderpost beetles, carpenter ants, fungi and algae. The tetrahydrate is also available as pellets for embedding in structural wood. Compared to other chemicals used for these purposes, it has the advantages of lack of odor, permanent effect, and low toxicity to humans and pets.

The compound was also shown to significantly reduce dust mite populations in the home when applied as a dilute solution to carpets and upholstery together with regular vacuum cleaning.

Disodium octaborate, applied to the soil or foliar spray, has been shown to inhibit pests of crops such as tomato and pistachio, with no observed detrimental effects to the plants.

== Safety ==
Disodium octaborate is neither flammable, nor combustible or explosive and has low acute oral and dermal toxicity. The oral 50% lethal doses (LD50) are 5.3 g/kg for guinea pig, 2g/kg for rats. However, it is classified as "reproductive toxicity category 1B (presumed human reproductive toxicant)" under the EU Classification, Labelling and Packaging Regulation (CLP Regulation). The CLP hazard code and statement are "H360FD: May damage fertility. May damage the unborn child."

On 22 February 2018, the Swedish Chemicals Agency (KEMI) submitted a proposal to the European Chemicals Agency (ECHA) to list disodium borate as a Substance of Very High Concern (SVHC) under the Registration, Evaluation, Authorisation and Restriction of Chemicals (REACH) Regulation.
