= Tetrahydroxyborate =

Ion

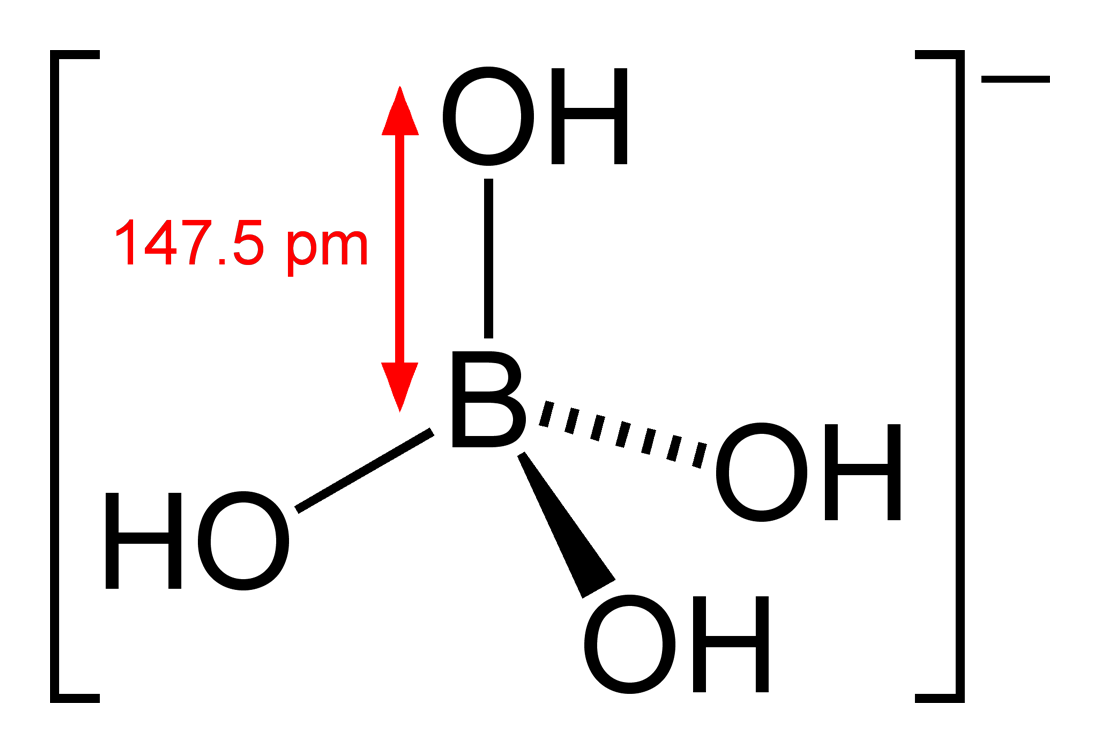
Stereo, skeletal formula of tetrahydroxyborate with a dimension
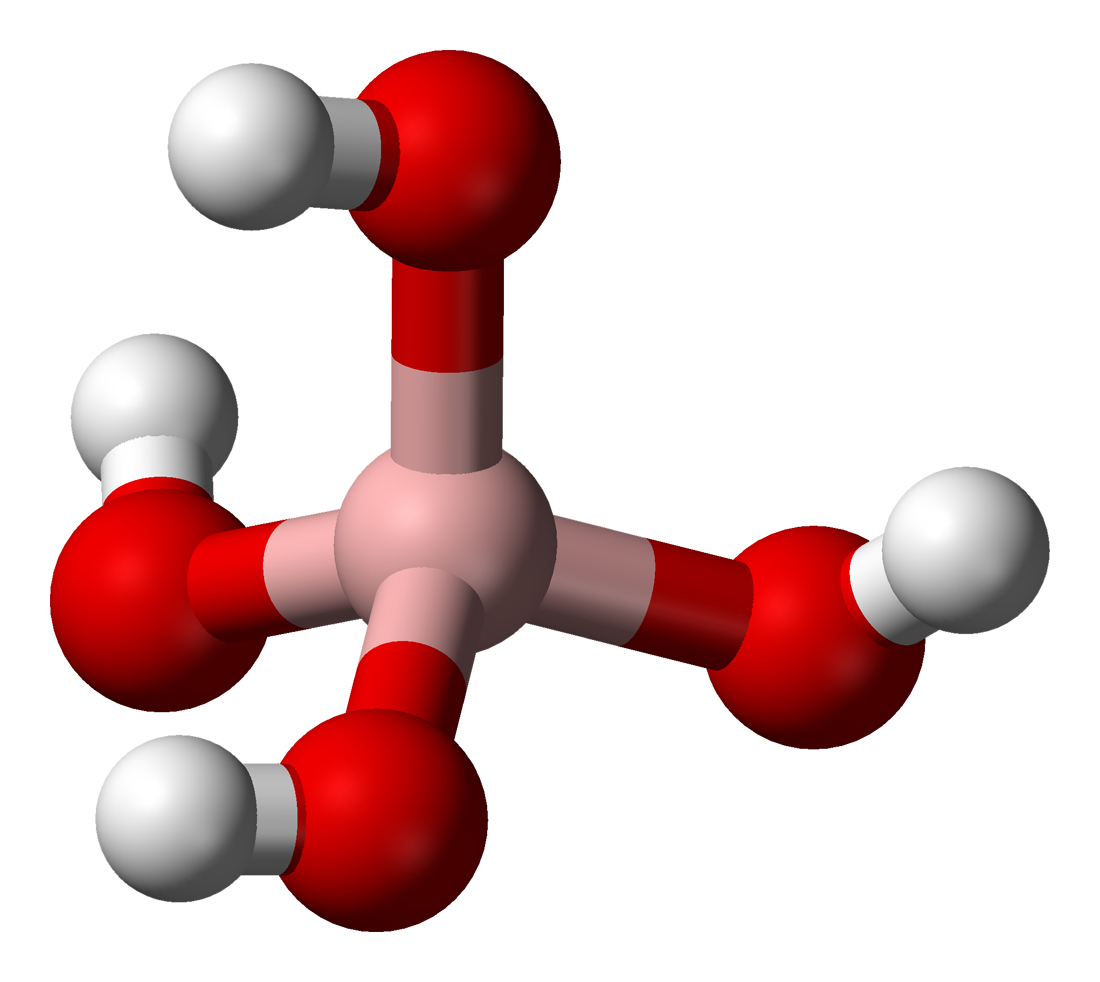
Ball and stick model of tetrahydroxyborate

Names
- IUPAC name Tetrahydroxyborate
- Systematic IUPAC name Tetrahydroxyboranuide; Tetrahydroxidoborate(1-)

Identifiers
CAS Number	15390-83-7
3D model (JSmol)	Interactive image
ChEBI	CHEBI:41132
ChEMBL	ChEMBL1231419
ChemSpider	154612
Gmelin Reference	1966
PubChem CID	177595
CompTox Dashboard (EPA)	DTXSID60934872
- InChI: InChI=1S/BH4O4/c2-1(3,4)5/h2-5H/q-1 Key: KCFLOKKYWBPKFN-UHFFFAOYSA-N
- SMILES: O[B-](O)(O)O

Properties
Chemical formula	[H_{4}BO_{4}]^{−}
Molar mass	78.840 g mol^{−1}
- Except where otherwise noted, data are given for materials in their standard state (at 25 °C [77 °F], 100 kPa). verify (what is ?) Infobox references

Tetrahydroxyborate is an inorganic anion with the chemical formula [BH_{4}O_{4}]^{−} or [B(OH)_{4}]^{−}. It contributes no colour to tetrahydroxyborate salts. It is found in the mineral hexahydroborite, Ca(B(OH)_{4})_{2} · 2 H_{2}O, originally formulated CaB_{2}O_{4} · 6 H_{2}O. It is one of the boron oxoanions, and acts as a weak base. The systematic names are tetrahydroxyboranuide (substitutive) and tetrahydroxidoborate(1−) (additive). It can be viewed as the conjugate base of boric acid.

== Structure ==
Tetrahydroxyborate has a symmetric tetrahedral geometry, isoelectronic with the hypothetical compound orthocarbonic acid (C(OH)_{4}).

== Chemical properties ==
=== Basicity ===
Tetrahydroxyborate acts as a weak Brønsted–Lowry base because it can assimilate a proton (H^{+}), yielding boric acid with release of water:

B(OH)^{−}_{4} + H^{+} ⇌ B(OH)_{3} + H_{2}O

It can also release a hydroxide anion HO^{−}, thus acting as a classical Arrhenius base:

B(OH)^{−}_{4} ⇌ B(OH)_{3} + OH^{−} (pK = 9.14 to the left)

Thus, when boric acid is dissolved in pure (neutral) water, most of it will exist as tetrahydroxyborate ions.

=== With diols ===
In aqueous solution, the tetrahydroxyborate anion reacts with cis-vicinal diols (organic compounds containing similarly-oriented hydroxyl groups in adjacent carbon atoms), (R_{1},R_{2})=C(OH)−C(OH)=(R_{3},R_{4})) such as mannitol, sorbitol, glucose and glycerol, to form anion esters containing one or two five-member −B−O−C−C−O− rings.

For example, the reaction with mannitol can be written as

[B(OH)_{4}]^{−} + H(HCOH)_{6}H ⇌ [B(OH)_{2}(H(HCOH)_{2}(HCO−)_{2}(HCOH) )]^{−} + 2 H_{2}O
[B(OH)_{2}(H(HCOH)_{2}(HCO−)_{2}(HCOH)_{2}H)]^{−} + H(HCOH)_{6}H ⇌ [B(H(HCOH)_{2}(HCO−)_{2}(HCOH)_{2}H)_{2}]^{−} + 2 H_{2}O

Giving the overall reaction

[B(OH)_{4}]^{−} + 2 H(HCOH)_{6}H ⇌ [B(H(HCOH)_{2}(HCO−)_{2}(HCOH)_{2}H)_{2}]^{−} + 4 H_{2}O

These mannitoborate esters are fairly stable and thus depletes the tetrahydroxyborate from the solution.

The addition of mannitol to an initially neutral solution containing boric acid or borates lowers the pH enough for the be titrated by a strong base as NaOH, including with an automated a potentiometric titrator. This is a reliable method to assay the amount of borate content present in the solution.

=== Other chemical reactions ===
Upon treatment with a strong acid, a metal tetrahydroxyborate converts to boric acid and the metal salt.

Oxidation of tetrahydroxyborate gives the perborate anion [B_{2}O_{4}(OH)_{4}]^{2−}:

2 [B(OH)_{4}]^{−} + 2 O → [B_{2}O_{4}(OH)_{4}]^{2−} + 2 H_{2}O

When heated to a high temperature, tetrahydroxyborate salts decompose to produce metaborate salts and water, or to produce boric acid and a metal hydroxide:

n [B(OH)_{4}]^{−} → (([BO_{2}]^{−})_{n}) + 2n H_{2}O
[B(OH)_{4}]^{−} → B(OH)_{3} + HO^{−}

== Production ==
Tetrahydroxyborate salts are produced by treating boric acid with an alkali such as sodium hydroxide, with catalytic amounts of water. Other borate salts may be obtained by altering the process conditions.

== Uses ==
Tetrahydroxyborate can be used as a cross-link in polymers.

== Occurrence ==
The tetrahydroxyborate anion is found in Na[B(OH)_{4}], Na_{2}[B(OH)_{4}]Cl and Cu^{II}[B(OH)_{4}]Cl.

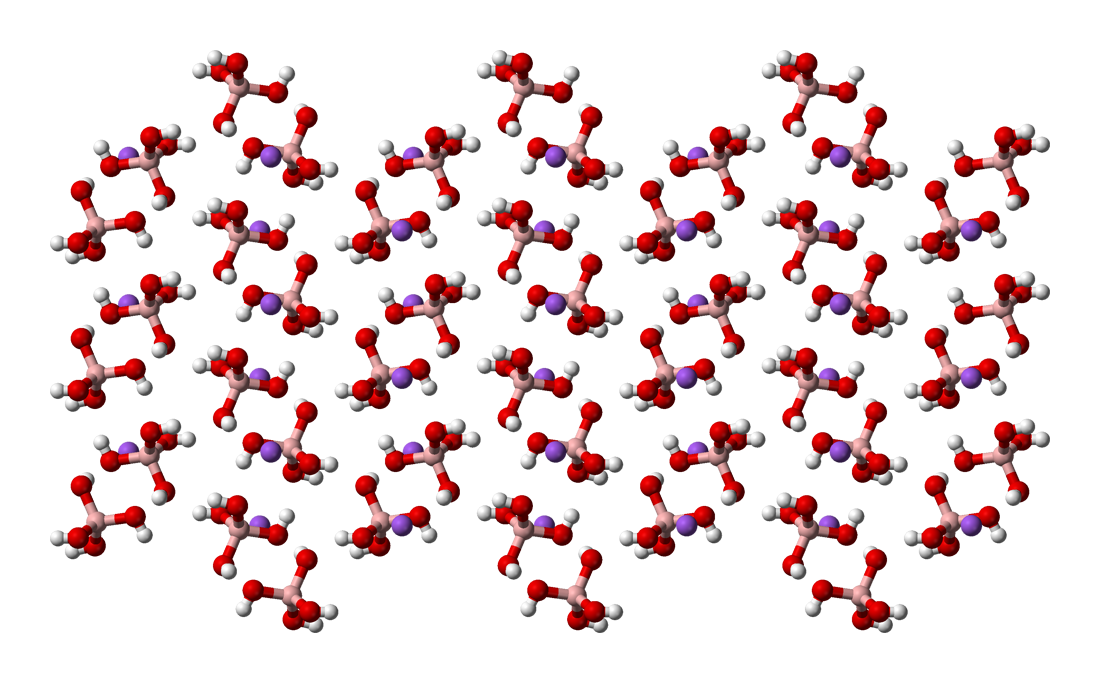
ball-and-stick model of the crystal
structure of sodium tetrahydroxyborate

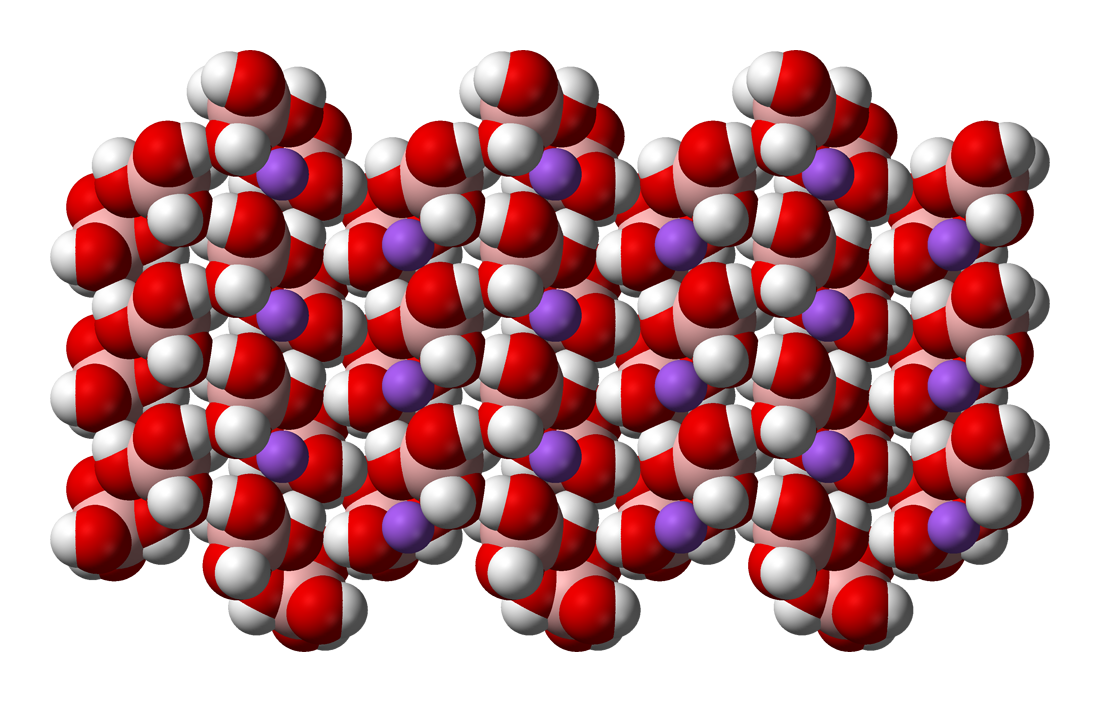
space-filling model of the crystal
structure of sodium tetrahydroxyborate

== See also ==
- Borate
- Tetrafluoroborate
