= Sodium pentaborate =

Disodium decaborate
Names
- Other names Sodium pentaborate

Identifiers
CAS Number	12007-92-0; trihydrate: 12631-71-9
3D model (JSmol)	Interactive image; trihydrate: Interactive image
ChemSpider	52085559
ECHA InfoCard	100.031.371
EC Number	234-522-7
PubChem CID	131634859
UNII	XQG9Q75WDN
CompTox Dashboard (EPA)	DTXSID50894254
- InChI: InChI=1S/B5O8.Na/c6-1-8-3-11-4-9-2(7)10-5(12-3)13-4;/q-1;+1 Key: OLBJLOUJSZVXOT-UHFFFAOYSA-N; Key: HLIXBZYPVKDOBP-UHFFFAOYSA-N; trihydrate: InChI=1S/B5O8.Na.3H2O/c6-1-8-3-11-4-9-2(7)10-5(12-3)13-4;;;;/h;;3*1H2/q-1;+1;;;
- SMILES: B(=O)OB1OB2OB(OB(O2)O1)[O-].[Na+]; trihydrate: O.O.O.[Na+].[O-]B1OB2OB(OB=O)OB(O1)O2

Properties
Chemical formula	Na^{+}[B_{5}O_{6}(OH)_{4}]^{−} or Na^{+}[B_{5}O_{7}(OH)_{2}]^{−}·H_{2}O
Molar mass	241.06 g·mol^{−1}
Appearance	Colorless crystalline solid
Solubility in water	Soluble
- Except where otherwise noted, data are given for materials in their standard state (at 25 °C [77 °F], 100 kPa). Infobox references

Sodium pentaborate, more properly disodium decaborate, is a chemical compound of sodium, boron, and oxygen; a salt with elemental formula NaB_{5}O_{8}, Na_{2}B_{10}O_{16}, or Na_{2}O·5B_{2}O_{3}. It is a colorless crystalline solid, soluble in water.

The compound is often encountered or traded as hydrates NaB_{5}O_{8}·nH_{2}O, Na_{2}B_{10}O_{16}·2nH_{2}O, or Na_{2}O·5B_{2}O_{3}·2nH_{2}O for n = 2, 4, 5, or other values. This formula is often misleading as some of the water molecules are actually hydroxyl groups covalently attached to boron atoms.

The compound is used in agriculture as a boron supplement in fertilizer with various trade names such as Solubor and Aquabor. It has also been tested as an additive to improve plasma electrolytic oxidation of magnesium alloys. It is also used in nuclear reactors as a neutron absorber/poison.

The name "sodium pentaborate" has also been used for a distinct compound with formula Na_{3}B_{5}O_{8}·nH_{2}O, better called trisodium pentaborate.

== Structure and preparation ==
=== Dihydrate ===
Sodium pentaborate "dihydrate" has the elemental formula NaH_{4}B_{5}O_{10}, which can be parsed as NaB_{5}O_{8}·2H_{2}O or Na_{2}O·5B_{3}O_{3}·4H_{2}O, however the correct formula seems to be either Na^{+}[B_{5}O_{6}(OH)_{4}]^{−} or Na^{+}[B_{5}O_{7}(OH)_{2}]^{−}·H_{2}O. The latter seems more likely, since under thermogravimetric analysis the material starts to decompose at about 130 °C with partial loss of water.

It can be prepared by reacting water solutions of sodium carbonate Na_{2}CO_{3} and boric acid B(OH)_{3} in mole ratio 1:10 and evaporating the resulting solution at 40 °C. It belongs to the monoclinic crystal system with symmetry group P2_{1}/c (C_{2h}^{5}) and parameters a = 1110.3 pm, b = 1643.7 pm, c = 1356.4 pm, α = 89.960°, β = 112.850° and γ = 89.9°, formulas per cell Z = 4.
