= Boric =

Boric is a chemistry term that refers to substances containing boron, such as:

- boric acid or orthoboric acid, B(OH)_{3}
- metaboric acid, an acid containing boron, HBO_{2}
- tetraboric acid or pyroboric acid, an acid containing boron, H_{2}B_{4}O_{7}
- boric oxide, specifically boron trioxide B_{2}O_{3}
- a boric ester, or organic borate

Boric may also refer to:

== People ==
- Borić, a South Slavic surname
  - Gabriel Boric (born 1986), Chilean politician of Croatian descent, current President of Chile
- Ban Borić, a ban (viceroy) of Bosnia around 1154–1167

== Places ==
- Boriç i Madh, Albania
- Boriç i Vogël, Albania
- a peak in the Crni Vrh (Brod) mountain in Kosovo
