= Lubecke =

Lubecke is a surname. Notable people with the surname include:

- Olga Boric-Lubecke, American engineer
- Victor Lubecke, American engineer
