= Boron fluoride =

Boron fluoride can refer to:

- Boron monofluoride, a gas stable only at very low temperatures
- Boron trifluoride, a stable gas
- Diboron tetrafluoride (B2F4) gas, boils at −34 Celsius
