= Boron oxide =

Boron oxide may refer to one of several oxides of boron:

- Boron trioxide (B_{2}O_{3}, diboron trioxide), the most common form
- Boron monoxide (BO)
- Boron suboxide (B_{6}O)
