= FBO =

FBO may refer to:

- Faith-based organization
- Film Booking Offices of America, a former American film studio
- Fixed-base operator, provider of ground services to general aviation at an airport
- Foxtel Box Office, an Australian pay-per-view television channel
- Framebuffer object, an architectural element of OpenGL image processing
- Office of Foreign Building Operations, now the Bureau of Overseas Buildings Operations, in the United States Department of State
- Boron monofluoride monoxide (chemical formula)
