= HBO2 =

HBO2 may refer to:

- Oxoborinic acid, an acid with the chemical formula HBO_{2}
- HBO2, an American premium cable TV channel run by HBO
- HbO2, oxyhemoglobin (Hb stands for Hemoglobin)- see Oxygen–haemoglobin dissociation curve
