= Ammonium pentaborate =

Names
- IUPAC name azanium;(7-oxido-2,4,6,8,9-pentaoxa-1,3,5,7-tetraborabicyclo[3.3.1]nonan-3-yl)oxy-oxoborane

Identifiers
CAS Number	12007-89-5; tetrahydrate: 12046-04-7; octahydrate: 12046-03-6
3D model (JSmol)	Interactive image; tetrahydrate: Interactive image; octahydrate: Interactive image
ChemSpider	52085560
EC Number	234-521-1
PubChem CID	131634794
UNII	E9ND2KN062
- InChI: InChI=1S/B5O8.H3N/c6-1-8-3-11-4-9-2(7)10-5(12-3)13-4;/h;1H3/q-1;/p+1 Key: OEAWHXRHGIIPBU-UHFFFAOYSA-O
- SMILES: B(=O)OB1OB2OB(OB(O2)O1)[O-].[NH4+]; tetrahydrate: B(=O)OB1OB2OB(OB(O2)O1)[O-].[NH4+].O.O.O.O; octahydrate: B(=O)OB1OB2OB(OB(O2)O1)[O-].[NH4+].O.O.O.O.O.O.O.O

Properties
Chemical formula	B_{5}H_{4}NO_{8}
Molar mass	200.08 g·mol^{−1}
Appearance	white crystals
Density	g/cm^{3} (hydrate)
Solubility in water	soluble

Hazards
- GHS labelling
Pictograms	(GHS07: Exclamation mark) (GHS08: Health hazard)
Signal word	Warning
- Except where otherwise noted, data are given for materials in their standard state (at 25 °C [77 °F], 100 kPa). Infobox references

Ammonium pentaborate is a chemical compound with the chemical formula NH_{4}B_{5}O_{8}.

== Synthesis ==
The compound can be prepared by a controlled reaction of ammonia, boric acid, and water.

== Physical properties ==
The compound forms white crystals soluble in water.

Ammonium pentaborate forms a tetrahydrate H_{4}N · B_{5}O_{8} · 4H_{2}O and an octahydrate H_{4}N · B_{5}O_{8} · 8H_{2}O.

== Uses ==
The compound is used to inhibit heat, flame, and corrosion in a variety of industrial applications.
