= Suboxide =

Oxides containing less oxygen than normally expected

Suboxides are a class of oxides wherein the electropositive element is in excess relative to the “normal” oxides. When the electropositive element is a metal, the compounds are sometimes referred to as “metal-rich”. Thus the normal oxide of caesium is Cs_{2}O, which is described as a Cs^{+} salt of O^{2−}. A suboxide of caesium is Cs_{11}O_{3}, where the charge on Cs is clearly less than 1+, but the oxide is still described as O^{2−}. Suboxides typically feature extensive bonding between the electropositive element, often leading to clusters.

Examples of suboxides other than alkali metal derivatives:

- Carbon suboxide, C_{3}O_{2};
- Boron suboxide, B_{6}O;
- Phosphorus suboxide, PO;
- Titanium suboxides, TiO, Ti_{2}O_{3}, Ti_{3}O_{5}, Ti_{4}O_{7}, and Ti_{5}O_{9}.

== Metal-containing suboxides ==
Suboxides are intermediates along the pathway that forms the normal oxide. Suboxides are sometimes visible when certain metals are exposed to small amounts of O_{2}:

22 Cs + 3 O_{2} → 2 Cs_{11}O_{3}
4 Cs_{11}O_{3} + 5 O_{2} → 22 Cs_{2}O

Several suboxides of caesium and rubidium have been characterized by X-ray crystallography. As of 1997, the inventory includes the following Rb_{9}O_{2}, Rb_{6}O, Cs_{11}O_{3}, Cs_{4}O, Cs_{7}O, Cs_{11}O_{3}Rb, Cs_{11}O_{3}Rb_{2}, and Cs_{11}O_{3}Rb_{3}.

Suboxides are generally colored compounds indicating a degree of electron delocalisation. Cs_{7}O has a unit cell containing a Cs_{11}O_{3} cluster and 10 Cs atoms. The cluster can be visualised as being composed of three face-sharing octahedra. In the picture below the caesium atoms are purple and the oxygen atoms are red. The Cs-Cs distance in the cluster is 376 pm, which is less than the Cs-Cs distance in the metal of 576 pm. Rb_{9}O_{2} and Rb_{6}O both contain the Rb_{9}O_{2} cluster, which can be visualised as two face-sharing octahedra. Rb_{6}O can be formulated as (Rb_{9}O_{2})Rb_{3}. The Rb-Rb distance in the cluster is 352 pm which is shorter than the Rb-Rb in the metal of 485 pm. It is suggested that caesium suboxides play a role in the Ag-O-Cs (S1) and multialkali Na-K-Sb-Cs photocathodes.

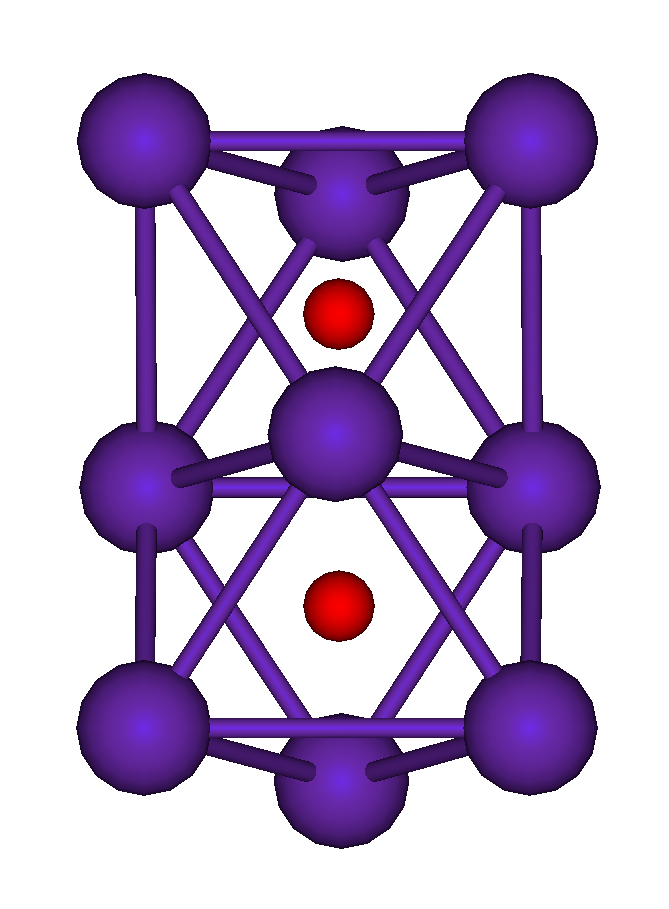
Rb_{9}O_{2} cluster

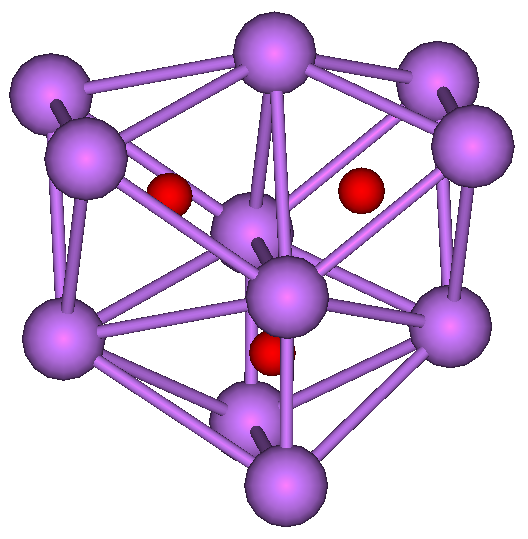
Cs_{11}O_{3} cluster

== Carbon suboxide ==
The suboxide of carbon adopts an unremarkable structure. As for related organic cumulenes (e.g. ketene), C_{3}O_{2} obeys the octet rule.

== Related compounds ==
Subnitrides are also known. For example, Na_{16}Ba_{6}N features a nitride-centered octahedral cluster of six barium atoms embedded in a matrix of sodium.
