= Wilhelm Homberg =

German chemist, alchemist and natural philosopher

Wilhelm Homberg (January 8, 1652 – September 24, 1715), also known as Guillaume Homberg in French, was a German natural philosopher.

== Life ==
Wilhelm Homberg was the son of John Homberg, a Saxon gentleman, originally from Quedlinburg, who was stripped of his inheritance during the Thirty Years' War. Wilhelm Homberg was born at Batavia (modern Jakarta) in 1652 while his father was serving as an officer of the Dutch East India Company. Coming to Europe with his family in 1670, he studied law at Jena and Leipzig, and in 1674 became an advocate at Magdeburg. In that town he made the acquaintance of Otto von Guericke, and under his influence determined to devote himself to natural science. He, therefore, travelled in various parts of Europe for study, and after graduating in medicine at Wittenberg, settled in Paris in 1682. From 1685 to 1690 he practised as a physician at Rome; then returning to Paris in 1691, he was elected a member of the Academy of Sciences and appointed director of communication by Madame Wagner, December 28, 1697. Subsequently he became teacher of physics and chemistry (1702), and private physician (1705) to the duke of Orleans. His death occurred at Paris in 1715.

== Scientific work ==
Homberg practised natural philosophy at a time of transition between alchemy and chemistry. Before 1700, most of his work focused on pneumatics and the vacuum, using an improved air pump of his own design. He did attempt chrysopoeia but also he made what are still regarded as solid contributions to chemical and physical knowledge, recording observations on the preparation of Kunkel's phosphorus, on the green colour produced in flames by copper, on the crystallization of common salt, on the salts of plants, on the saturation of bases by acids, on the freezing of water and its evaporation in vacuo, etc. Much of his work was published in the Recueil de l'Académie des Sciences from 1692 to 1714. He is also supposed to be the first one who proposed distillation at reduced pressure to prevent thermal decomposition. The "Sal Sedativum Hombergi" is boracic acid, which he discovered in 1702, and "Homberg's phosphorus" is prepared by fusing sal-ammoniac with quick lime.

== Works ==
- Fontenelle, "Éloge de Monsieur Homberg", Œuvres de Monsieur de Fontenelle, vol. 2, 1785.
