= Tetrahalodiboranes =

Class of diboron compounds

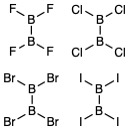
Structures of Tetrahalodiboranes

Tetrahalodiboranes are a class of diboron compounds with the formula B_{2}X_{4} (X = F, Cl, Br, I). These compounds were first discovered in the 1920s, but, after some interest in the middle of the 20th century, were largely ignored in research. Compared to other diboron compounds, tetrahalodiboranes are fairly unstable and historically have been difficult to prepare; thus, their use in synthetic chemistry is largely unexplored, and research on tetrahalodiboranes has stemmed from fundamental interest in their reactivity. Recently, there has been a resurgence in interest in tetrahalodiboranes, particularly in diboron tetrafluoride as a reagent to promote doping of silicon with B^{+} for use in semiconductor devices.

== Structure ==
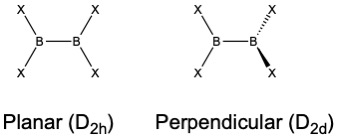
Geometry for most stable tetrahalodiborane conformers

Because the perpendicular and planar geometries of tetrahalodiboranes are generally very close in energy, the energetic difference between these two structures has been the most investigated aspect of the geometry of these molecules. As it turns out, the difference is dependent on the identity of the halide in the compound. B_{2}F_{4} adopts a planar geometry (D_{2h} symmetry) in both as a solid and in the gas phase. The barrier to rotation, however, is small (only 0.42 kcal/mo)l. Diboron tetrachloride (B_{2}Cl_{4}), however, adopts a planar geometry when crystalized but favors the perpendicular geometry (D_{2d} symmetry) in the gas phase. Computations of the relative stability of the two conformers indicate that the D_{2d} geometry is ~2 kcal/mol lower in energy; the planar geometry in the solid phase is thought to be due to packing effects. Continuing this trend, computational modeling and experimental results agree that B_{2}Br_{4} and B_{2}I_{4} favor the perpendicular D_{2d} geometry.

== Synthesis ==
The first synthesis of a tetrahalodiborane was reported by Stock et al. in 1925 where the authors reduced BCl_{3} to form B_{2}Cl_{4} by running a current between zinc electrodes immersed in liquid BCl_{3}. Later work explored gas phase syntheses of B_{2}Cl_{4} using gaseous BCl_{3} and mercury electrodes. Early characterization of B_{2}Cl_{4} reported the to be a colorless, pyrophoric liquid that decomposes at temperatures above 0 °C. B_{2}F_{4} was not synthesized until 1958 when Finch and Schlesinger reported the successful synthesis of B_{2}Cl_{4} with antimony trifluoride to form B_{2}F_{4}. Unlike B_{2}Cl_{4}, B_{2}F_{4} is stable at room temperature. The heavier tetrahalodiboranes, B_{2}Br_{4} and B_{2}I_{4}, were first published in 1949 by Schlesinger et al. and Schumb respectively. B_{2}Br_{4} was first accessed by reacting B_{2}Cl_{4} and BBr_{3}. B_{2}I_{4} was first synthesized using electrodeless radiofrequency discharge to reduce BI_{3}. B_{2}Br_{4} is stable at temperatures below -40 °C, while B_{2}I_{4} is stable below 0 °C. B_{2}I_{4} also degrades when exposed to light. Decomposition of B_{2}I_{4} at elevated temperatures yields a BI_{3} and a black solid found to be a mixture of B_{9}I_{9} and B_{8}I_{8}.

The initial interest in tetrahaloiboranes was largely fundamental, and more applied consideration of tetrahalodiboranes was largely limited by the difficulty of synthesis and the low stability of isolated compounds. Recent improvements in the synthesis of tetrahalodiboranes has yielded more convenient solution phase syntheses of B_{2}F_{4}, B_{2}Cl_{4}, B_{2}Br_{4}, and B_{2}I_{4}. The solution phase synthesis of B_{2}Br_{4} first reported by Noth et al in 1981 has not been improved upon. To form B_{2}Br_{4} in solution, B_{2}(OMe)_{4} is treated with BBr_{3}. Other tetrahalodiboranes can be accessed from B_{2}Br_{4} in the solution phase by reacting with SbF_{3}, GaCl_{3}, or BI_{3} to form B_{2}F_{4}, B_{2}Cl_{4}, or B_{2}I_{4} respectively. These improvements in synthetic methods have opened the door for exploring potential applications of tetrahalodiboranes; while this interest has been fairly limited thus far, researchers have begun to explore the use of tetrahalodiboranes as synthetic building blocks and for use in industrial applications. Notably, recent publications discussing tetrahalodiboranes have been largely in patent literature discussing the use of B_{2}F_{4}to replace BF_{3} as a feed chemical to dope semiconductors with boron ions.

== Reactivity ==
=== Lewis base adduct formation ===
Adduct formed by tetrahalodiborane and two lewis bases

The boron atoms in tetrahalodiboranes are highly lewis acidic and readily form adducts with neutral lewis bases. Though the formation of these complexes is usually energetically favorable, early attempts to form these lewis acid base complexes were hindered by the lability of the halogen substituents; prior to the 1992 publication of three additional phosphane-tetrahalodiborane(4) adducts, only three lewis acid-lewis base adducts had been reported. Other work has described many more lewis acid-lewis base adducts that form readily, but also outline how stability challenges with tetrahalodiboranes persist even in stabilized complexes. Examples of these unstable tetrahalodiborane-lewis base adducts include the bis-diethyl ether adduct formed with B_{2}Cl_{4} or B_{2}F_{4}, the bis-adduct of B_{2}Cl_{4} and either SH_{2} or PH_{3}, and adducts formed by B_{2}Cl_{4} or B_{2}F_{4} and weak phosphine donors such as PCl_{3} or PBr_{3}.

There are, however, some adducts that are stable beyond room temperature. B_{2}Cl_{4} and B_{2}F_{4} both form stable mono- and bis-adducts with aprotic nitrogen donors. The first of these stable lewis base-tetrahalodiborane adducts was published in 2012 by Braunshcweig et al. showing that B_{2}Br_{4}(IDip)_{2} (where IDip = 1,3-bis(2,6-diisopropylphenyl)-imidazole-2-ylidene) is stable at ambient temperature. B_{2}Br_{4}(IDip)_{2}could then be reduced to form B_{2}Br_{2}(IDip)_{2}, a stable diborene, and could ultimately be reduced further to form >B_{2}(IDip)_{2} the first isolable diboryne. Since this discovery, the Braunschweig group has published a number of other stable tetrahalodiborane adducts including some monoadducts and some asymmetrical bis adducts. These adducts are typically characterized using ^{11}B NMR.

=== Reaction with transition metals ===
There has been some investigation of the reactivity of tetrahalodiboranes with transition metals. Norman et al. reported reactivity of B_{2}F_{4} with PtL_{2} to form cis-[Pt(BF_{2})_{2}L_{2}] where L_{2}=_{2}PPh_{3}, Ph_{2}P(CH_{2})_{4}PPh_{2}. Because the boron-halide bonds in B_{2}F_{4} are substantially less reactive than in heavier tetrahalodiboranes, it is unsurprising that reactivity with Pt occurs at the B-B bond.

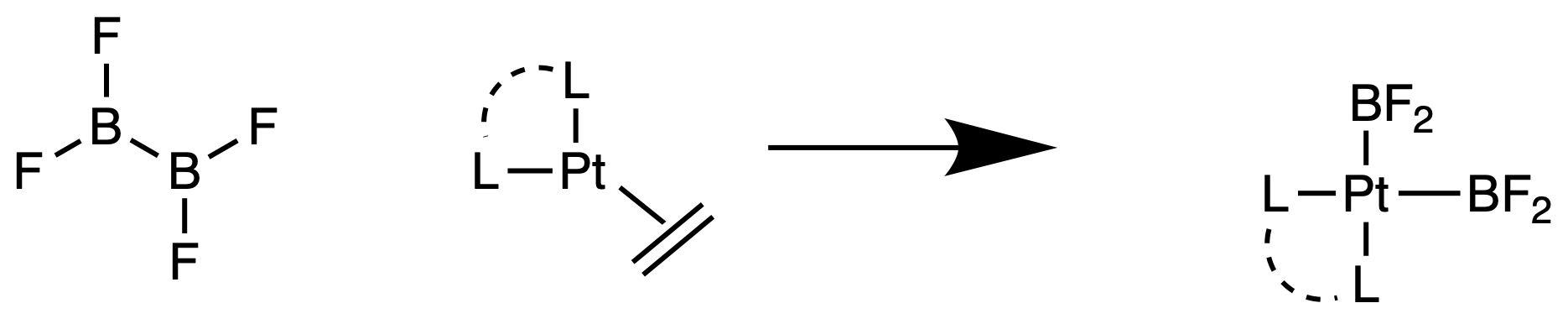

Because it was expected that heavier tetrahalodiboranes might have more reactive boron-halide bonds, the reactivity of B_{2}I_{4} with electron rich Pt(PCy_{3})_{2} was explored. The greater lability of the B-I bond relative to the B-F bond in B_{2}F_{4} allowed for the formation of a diplatnum complex with borryl ligands and a bridging [B_{2}I_{4}].

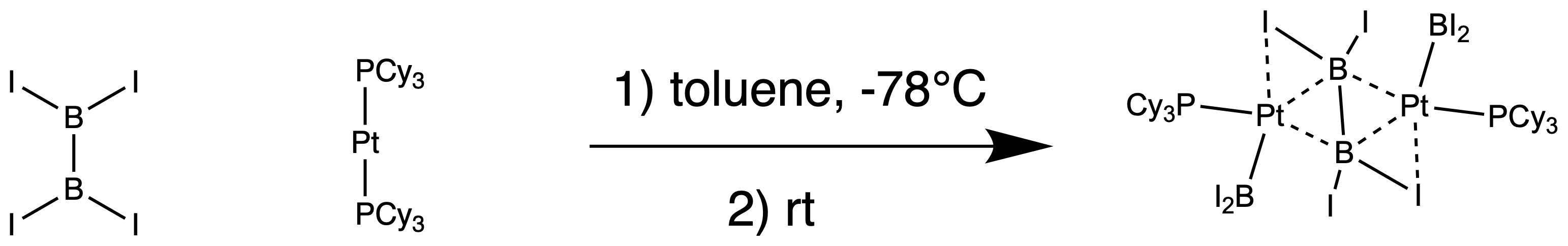
Reaction of diboron tetrachloride with a platinum complex to form a diplatinum complex

=== Reaction with boriranylideneboranes ===
In 2001, Seibert et al. showed that three boriranylideneboranes first synthesized by Berndt et al. in the 1980s could be reacted with tetrahalodiboranes to yield interesting boron containing compounds shown in the scheme below. In the first reaction, both the chlorine and fluorine containing compounds were synthesized in good yields, but the fluorine compound was noticeably less stable. The all compounds shown below were characterized by ^{11}B,^{1}H and ^{13}C NMR.

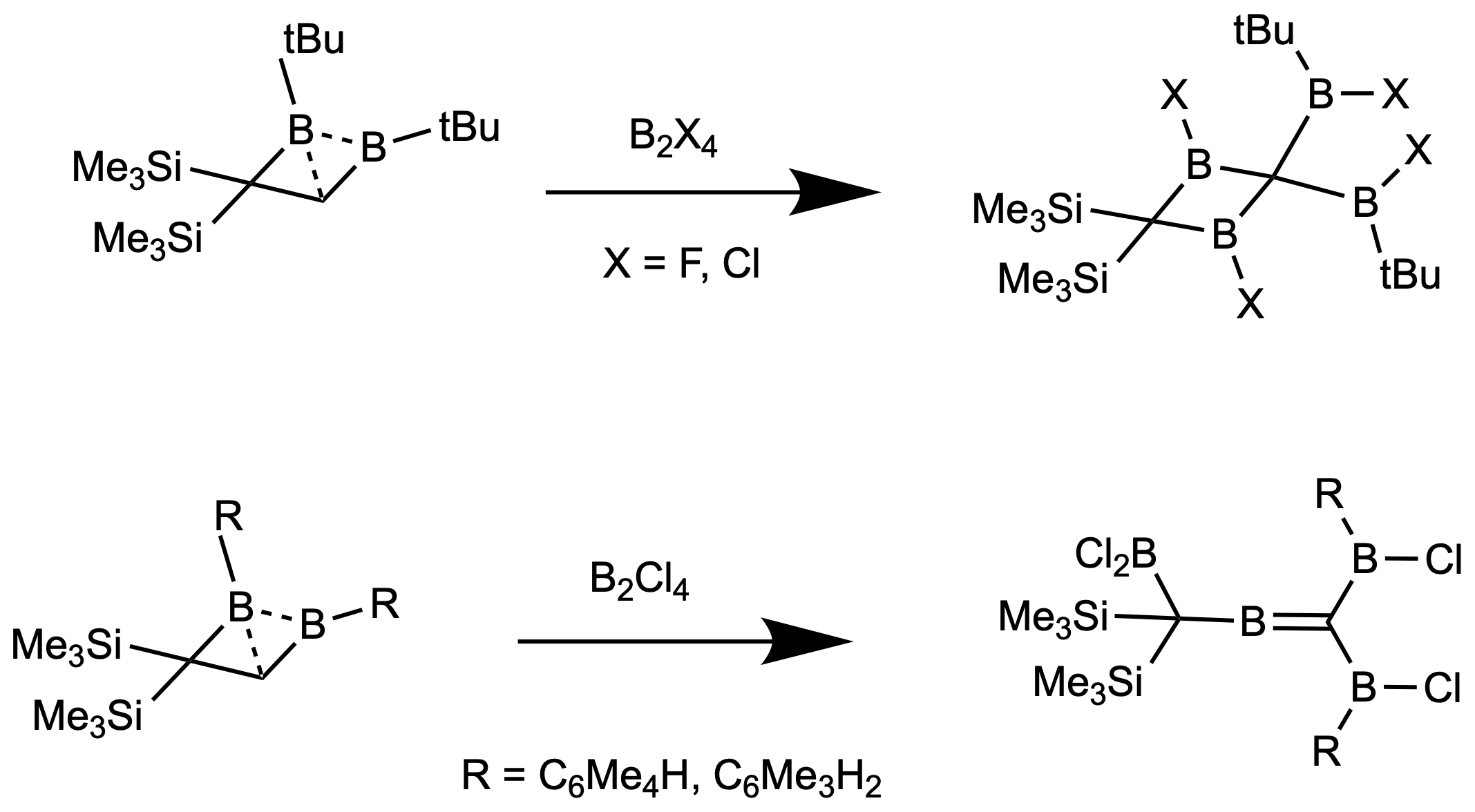
Reported reactions between tetrahalodiboranes and boriranylideneboranes

=== Addition to unsaturated hydrocarbons ===
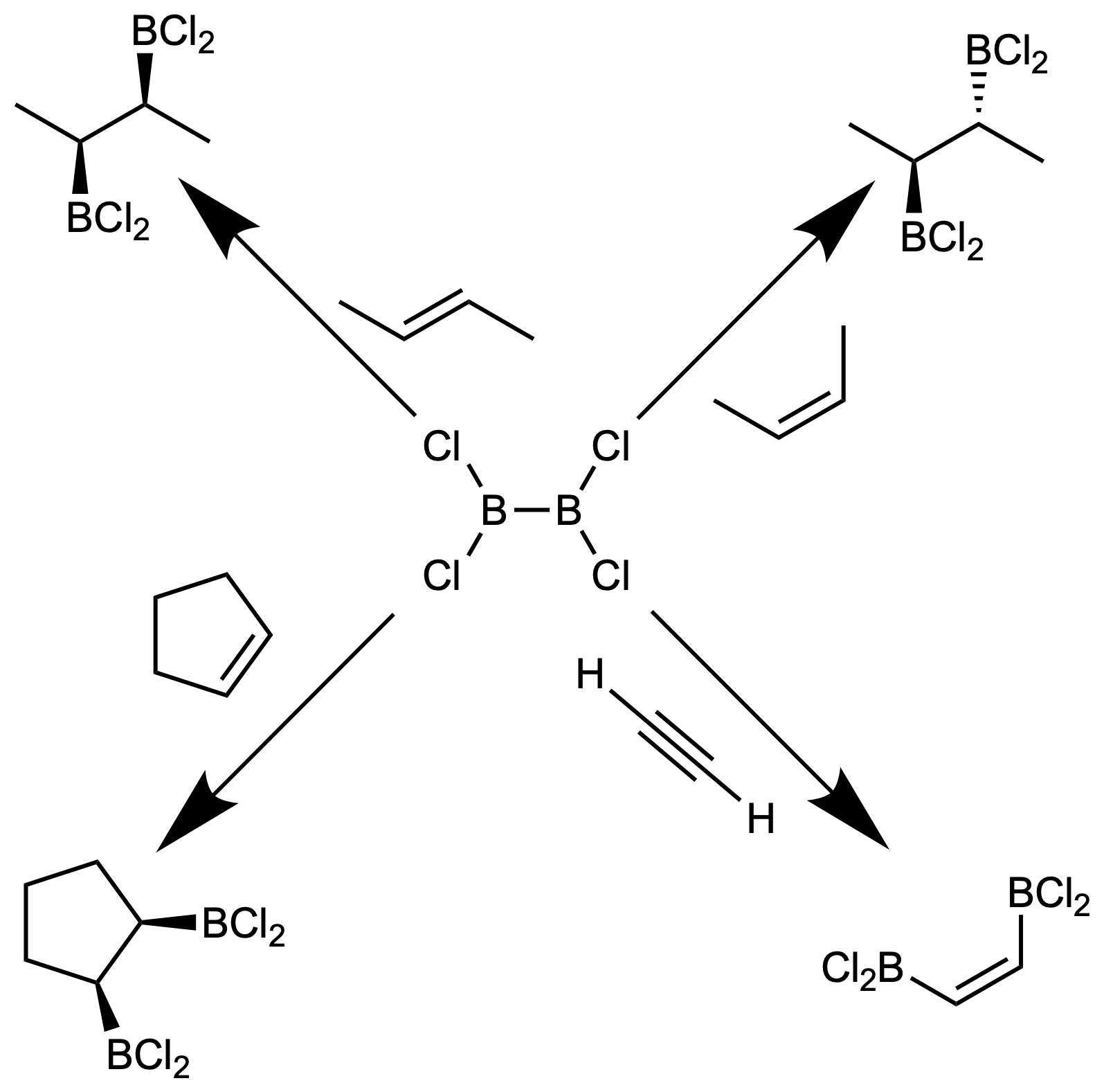
Some representative reactions showing 1,2-addition of diboron tetrachloride to hydrocarbons. Some of these reactions can also be carried out under more forcing conditions with diboron tetrafluoride

Tetrahalodiboranes can add to unsaturated hydrocarbons. Schlesinger et al. published 1,2-additions of B_{2}Cl_{4} to ethylene and acetylene. Later work explored the reactivity of B_{2}Cl_{4} with other alkenes, alkynes and dienes and showed that B_{2}F_{4} can react similarly. B_{2}Br_{4} can also add to alkenes. In 2015, Brown et al. used electronic structure calculation to provide mechanistic information on some of these (uncatalyzed) boron additions. Most interestingly, the authors were able to provide mechanistic information explaining the stereospecificity of the reaction of B_{2}Cl_{4} with 1,2-disubstituted alkenes.
