= Boron monoxide =

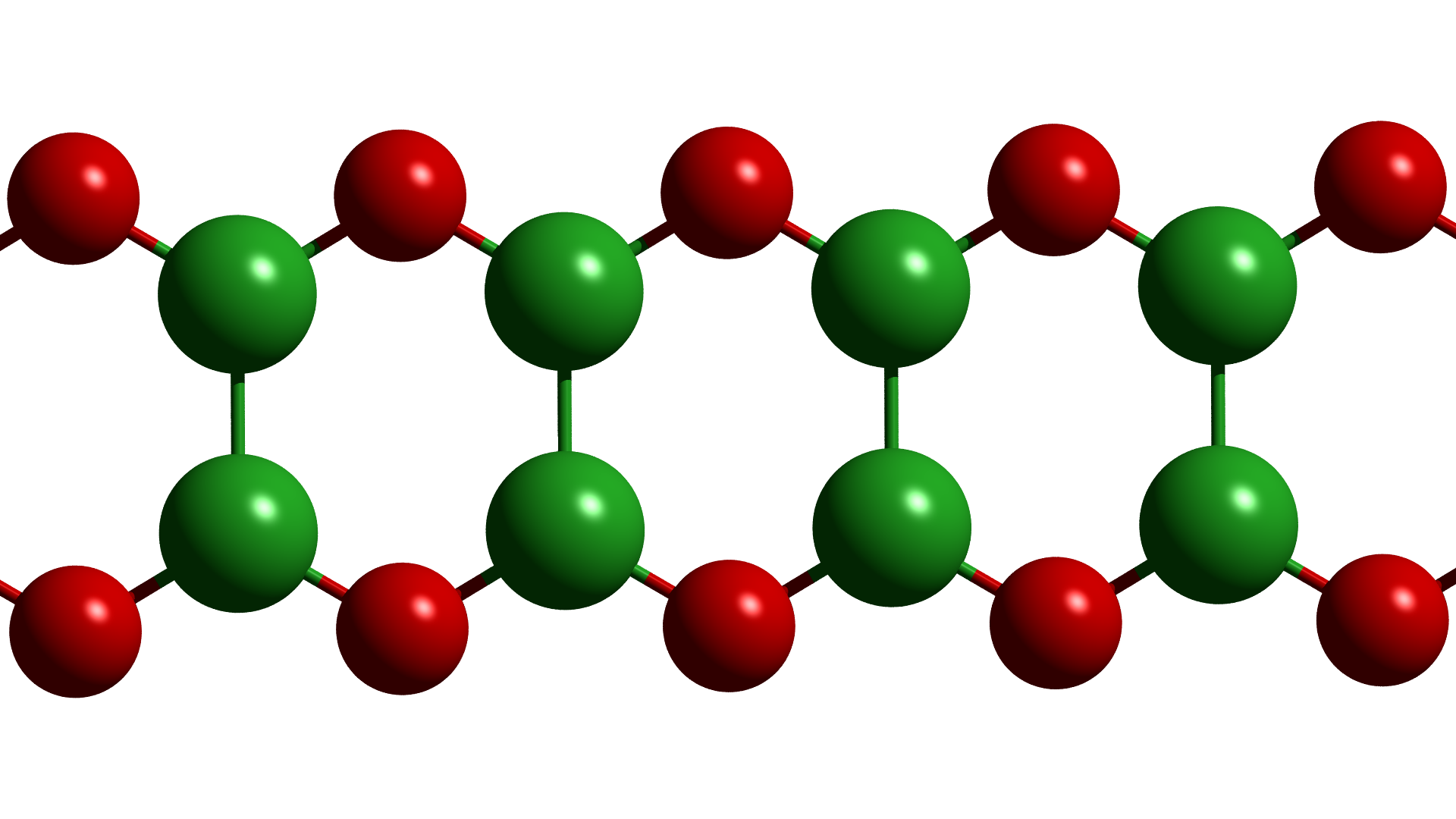

Names
- IUPAC name oxoboron

Identifiers
CAS Number	12505-77-0
3D model (JSmol)	Interactive image; Interactive image; Interactive image
ChEBI	CHEBI:30162
ChemSpider	4885722
PubChem CID	6327189
UNII	0IDJ8AZ8DG
- InChI: InChI=1S/BO/c1-2 Key: MOWNZPNSYMGTMD-UHFFFAOYSA-N
- SMILES: O=BB=O; [B]=O; O1B2B1O2

Properties
Chemical formula	BO
Molar mass	26.81 g/mol
Appearance	white powder
- Except where otherwise noted, data are given for materials in their standard state (at 25 °C [77 °F], 100 kPa). verify (what is ?) Infobox references

Boron monoxide (BO) is a binary compound of boron and oxygen. The material was first reported in 1940, with a modified synthetic procedure published in 1955, however, the material's structure had remained unknown for nearly a century. A number of allotropes of BO have been theorized ranging from molecular species, to 1D, 2D, and 3D-structured materials, but these were difficult to differentiate using common structural characterization methods. The material sheets composed of O-bridged B_{4}O_{2} rings, and most likely adopts the 1D polymeric structure initially proposed in 1955. Due to the lack of precise structural information on the identity of the compound, it has not found widespread use in industry.

== Synthesis ==
Boron monoxide is typically produced through the condensation of tetrahydroxydiboron (chemical formula; B_{2}(OH)_{4}) at temperatures of 200–500°C. The use of higher temperatures (700°C) leads to the formation of hard B_{2}O_{3} glasses. These glasses generally have a dark appearance, from the dissolved elemental boron, and are also produced directly through the dissolution of B into B_{2}O_{3}.

BO has been used in the synthesis of B_{2}Cl_{4}, which served as the only evidence, until 2010, of the preservation of the B–B bond present in the precursor compound.

== See also ==
- Boron suboxide
- Boron trioxide
- Boron
