= Tris(2,2,2-trifluoroethyl) borate =

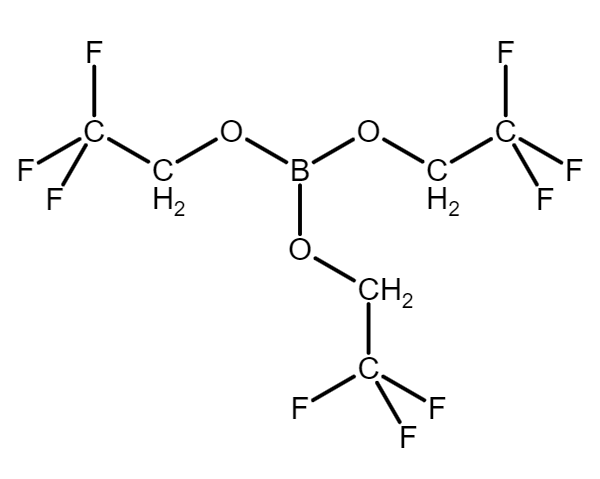

Names
- IUPAC name Tris(2,2,2-trifluoroethyl) borate
- Other names: Boric acid tris(2,2,2-trifluoroethyl) ester; Sheppard amidation reagent; Sheppard reagent; Tris(2,2,2-trifluoroethoxy)borane; Tris(2,2,2-trifluoroethoxy)boron

Identifiers
CAS Number	659-18-7
3D model (JSmol)	Interactive image
ChemSpider	2835631
ECHA InfoCard	100.215.852
EC Number	689-073-3
PubChem CID	3599767
CompTox Dashboard (EPA)	DTXSID60394033
- InChI: InChI=1S/C6H6BF9O3/c8-4(9,10)1-17-7(18-2-5(11,12)13)19-3-6(14,15)16/h1-3H2 Key: DIEXQJFSUBBIRP-UHFFFAOYSA-N
- SMILES: B(OCC(F)(F)F)(OCC(F)(F)F)OCC(F)(F)F

Properties
Chemical formula	B(OCH_{2}CF_{3})_{3}
Molar mass	307.91 g·mol^{−1}
Appearance	Colourless liquid
Density	1.430 g/cm^{3}
Boiling point	94.3 °C (201.7 °F; 367.4 K)
Refractive index (n_{D})	1.298

Hazards
- Occupational safety and health (OHS/OSH)
Main hazards	Flammable liquid and vapor
- GHS labelling
Pictograms	(GHS02: Flammable)
Signal word	Warning
Hazard statements	H226
Precautionary statements	P210, P233, P240, P241, P242, P243, P280, P303+P361+P353, P370+P378, P403+P235, P501
Flash point	43.3 °C (109.9 °F)
- Except where otherwise noted, data are given for materials in their standard state (at 25 °C [77 °F], 100 kPa). Infobox references

Tris(2,2,2-trifluoroethyl) borate, also commonly referred to as the Sheppard amidation reagent, is a chemical compound with the formula B(OCH_{2}CF_{3})_{3}. This borate ester reagent is used in organic synthesis.

== Preparation ==
Tris(2,2,2-trifluoroethyl) borate can be prepared by reaction of trifluoroethanol with boron trichloride, borane dimethylsulfide, boron tribromide, or boric anhydride. The latter is more convenient for larger scale preparations due to its low cost and ease of handling.

CF_{3}CH_{2}OH + B_{2}O_{3} → B(OCH_{2}CF_{3})_{3}

The product is purified by distillation.

== Applications ==
The reagent is mostly used in condensation reactions. It has been shown to promote the direct formation of amides from carboxylic acids and amines as well as the formation of imines from amines or amides with carbonyl compounds.

It has also been used for the coupling of unprotected amino acids with amines.

It has also been shown to mediate formylation of amines, via transamidation of dimethylformamide.

It is a strong Lewis acid (acceptor number = 66, Gutmann-Beckett method).
