= Boron monofluoride monoxide =

Boron oxyfluoride

Names
- IUPAC name Fluoro(oxo)borane
- Other names boron monofluoride monoxide

Identifiers
CAS Number	23361-56-0
3D model (JSmol)	Interactive image
ChemSpider	124393
PubChem CID	141025
CompTox Dashboard (EPA)	DTXSID20177920
- InChI: InChI=1/BFO/c2-1-3 Key: FHYICEHKTRQYRP-UHFFFAOYSA-N
- SMILES: B(=O)F

Properties
Chemical formula	BFO
Molar mass	45.81 g·mol^{−1}
Appearance	Gas

Thermochemistry
Std enthalpy of formation (Δ_{f}H^{⦵}_{298})	48.0 ± 3.0 kcal/mol

Related compounds
Related oxyhalides	boron oxychloride
Related compounds	boron monofluoride boron monoxide
- Except where otherwise noted, data are given for materials in their standard state (at 25 °C [77 °F], 100 kPa). Infobox references

Boron monofluoride monoxide or oxoboryl fluoride or fluoroxoborane is an unstable inorganic molecular substance with formula FBO. It is also called boron fluoride oxide, fluoro(oxo)borane or fluoro-oxoborane. The molecule is stable at high temperatures, but below 1000 °C condenses to a trimer (BOF)_{3} called trifluoroboroxin. FBO can be isolated as a triatomic non-metallic molecule in an inert gas matrix, and has been condensed in solid neon and argon. When an attempt is made to condense the gas to a solid in bulk, a polymeric glass is formed, which is deficient in fluoride, and when heated forms a glassy froth like popcorn. Boron fluoride oxide has been studied because of its production in high energy rocket fuels that contain boron and fluorine, and in the form of an oxyfluoride glass. BOF glass is unusual in that it can condense directly from gas.

== Properties ==
=== Monomer ===
The FBO molecule is linear with structure F-B=O. The F-B bond length is 1.283 Å, and B-O bond is 1.207 Å.

The infrared spectrum of BFO has vibrational bands at 1900, 1050, and 500 cm^{−1}. Spectroscopic constants of the ^{10}BFO molecule are B=9349.2711 MHz D=3.5335 kHz and for ^{11}BFO molecule they are B=9347.3843 MHz D=3.5273 kHz The monomer is stable either at low pressures, or temperatures over 1000 °C. Below this temperature, the monomers associate to form a trimer called trifluoroboroxole.

Heat of formation Δ_{f}H^{⦵}_{298 K} is predicted to be -146.1 kcal/mol. Proton affinity 149.6 kcal/mol.

=== Trimer ===
If a hot BFO gas is cooled slowly it dismutates back into B_{2}O_{3} and BF_{3}. At room temperature this dismutation completes in an hour.

Boron fluoride oxide forms a trimer with a ring composed of alternating oxygen and boron atoms, with fluorine bonded to the boron. (BFO)_{3}. The ring structure puts it in the class of boroxols. This is also called trifluoroboroxin. The trimer is the predominant form in gas at 1000K. When heated to 1200K it mostly converts to the monomer BFO. Boron oxyfluoride can be condensed from vapour to a fluorine deficient glass at temperatures below 190° by very rapid cooling. When heated this deposit has a temperature at which it loses more BF_{3} to form a frothy or porous glass that resembles popcorn. The glass deposited at lower temperatures has a higher proportion of fluorine. Deposits at −40 °C are predicted to have a 1:1 ratio of fluorine to oxygen. Below -135° (BFO)_{3} is stable.

The heat of formation of the trimer from the monomer (BFO)_{3} → 3BFO is 131 kcal/mol.

=== Glass ===
Boron oxyfluoride glass is transparent and colourless. It is stable in dry air, but it is hygroscopic and in normal air becomes white and opaque. When heated the glass will encounter a glass transition temperature (T_{g}) at which it ceases to be a glass, and produces BF_{3} gas and a boron oxyfluoride with less fluorine is left behind. This glass transition temperature is determined from where the pressure of BF_{3} produced exceeds the strength of the glass. The hypothetical structure of BOF glass, is of long chains of B-O-B-O with fluorine attached to each boron. These can be considered as BO_{2}F triangles linked in a chain by O atoms. These chains are tangled up like spaghetti in the glass. When the substance becomes fluorine deficient, crosslinks with oxygen form between the chains, and it becomes more two dimensional in structure. BF_{3} is produced when the terminals of two linear −(BF)O− chains join with each other. These ends contain -O-BF_{2}, and when two meet, BF_{3} can be eliminated and the chain extended with oxygen.

== Occurrence ==
BFO is expected to form in supernovae II output in gas between 1,000 and 2,000 °C and pressures around 10^{−7} bar.

== Preparation ==
Otto Ruff noticed that a mixture of BF_{3} and SiF_{4} passing over molten B_{2}O_{3} produced some SiO_{2} and redistributed B_{2}O_{3} into cold parts of the reaction tube. He speculated that there must be some heat stable intermediate that converted back into the original components on cooling. Several years later, Paul Baumgarten and Werner Bruns made the boron oxyfluoride trimer by passing BF_{3} over solid B_{2}O_{3} at 450 °C.

BFO is an intermediate in the hydrolysis of BF_{3} along with BF(OH)_{2}, BF_{2}OH and boric acid.

- BF_{3} + H_{2}O → BFO + 2HF;
- BF_{2}OH → BFO + HF;
- BF(OH)_{2} → BFO + H_{2}O

Another way in which BFO can be made is to vapourise B_{2}O_{3} with BF_{3}.

When BF_{3} is heated with air, BFO gas predominates from 2800° to 4000 °C, being a maximum at 3200°. Above 4000 °C BO dominates.

Hot BF_{3} passed over some oxides such as SiO_{2} forms BFO. Other oxides that can yield boron oxyfluoride are magnesium oxide, titanium dioxide, carbonates or alumina.

In the plasma phase HF reacts with BO_{2}H^{+}_{2}, B_{2}OH^{+}, B_{3}O^{+}_{4}, B_{2}O^{+}_{4}, B_{2}O^{+}_{2}, B_{2}OH^{+} to make FBO, and other products including FBOH and FBO^{+}.

== Related ==
The B-O-F molecule theoretically exists but it releases energy when it rearranges to F-B-O. A related molecule is BOF_{2}. Molecules related to the trimer include B_{3}O_{3}ClF_{2}, B_{3}O_{3}Cl_{2}F, and (BOCl)_{3}.

FBO is predicted to be able to insert noble gas atoms between the fluorine and boron atom yielding FArBO, FKrBO and FXeBO. The molecules are predicted to be linear.

== Uses ==
Boron oxyfluoride could be used in boriding steel. By using a gas, sticking solids onto the steel is avoided. Also this method allows control of the boron concentration, and mostly forms Fe_{2}B instead of the more brittle FeB. Burning boron releases much energy, so its use in explosives or fuel is being researched. To maximise energy output, both fluorine and oxygen are used to react, and thus FBO and related molecules are formed and may be in the exhaust.
