= Boric acid (data page) =

Chemical data page

This page provides supplementary chemical data on boric acid.

== Thermodynamic properties ==
Phase behavior
| Triple point | ? K (? °C), ? Pa |
| Critical point | ? K (? °C), ? Pa |
| Std enthalpy change of fusion, Δ_{fus}H^{~~o~~} | ? kJ/mol |
| Std entropy change of fusion, Δ_{fus}S^{~~o~~} | ? J/(mol·K) |
| Std enthalpy change of vaporization, Δ_{vap}H^{~~o~~} | ? kJ/mol |
| Std entropy change of vaporization, Δ_{vap}S^{~~o~~} | ? J/(mol·K) |
Solid properties
| Std enthalpy change of formation, Δ_{f}H^{~~o~~}_{solid} | −1093.99 kJ/mol |
| Standard molar entropy, S^{~~o~~}_{solid} | 88.7 J/(mol K) |
| Heat capacity, c_{p} | ? J/(mol K) |
Liquid properties
| Std enthalpy change of formation, Δ_{f}H^{~~o~~}_{liquid} | ? kJ/mol |
| Standard molar entropy, S^{~~o~~}_{liquid} | ? J/(mol K) |
| Heat capacity, c_{p} | ? J/(mol K) |
Gas properties
| Std enthalpy change of formation, Δ_{f}H^{~~o~~}_{gas} | −992.28 kJ/mol |
| Standard molar entropy, S^{~~o~~}_{gas} | 295.23 J/(mol K) |
| Heat capacity, c_{p} | ? J/(mol K) |

== Spectral data ==
UV-Vis
| Lambda-max | ? nm |
| Extinction coefficient | ? |
IR
| Major absorption bands | ? cm^{−1} |
NMR
Proton NMR
Carbon-13 NMR
Other NMR data
MS
| Masses of main fragments |

== Structure and properties data ==
Structure and properties
| Index of refraction | ? |
| Dielectric constant | ? C^{2}/(N·m^{2}) at ? °C |
| Bond strength | ? |
| Bond length | ? 120OC |
| Bond angle | ? |
| Magnetic susceptibility | ? |

== Material Safety Data Sheet ==
The handling of this chemical may incur notable safety precautions. It is highly recommend that you seek the Material Safety Datasheet (MSDS) for this chemical from a reliable source and follow its directions.

- SIRI
- Science Stuff
