= Borić =

Borić is a surname found in Croatia mainly among Croats, but also among Serbs and Bosniaks. They were historically present around the town of Senj.

It may refer to:

- Anthony Boric (born 1983), New Zealand rugby player of Croatian descent
- Drazen Boric, German paralympic athlete
- Gabriel Boric (born 1986), Chilean politician of Croatian descent, current President of Chile
- Olga Boric-Lubecke, American engineer of Serbian origin
- Rada Borić (born 1951), Croatian scholar, feminist, and women's rights activist
- Thomas Boric (born 1961), American wrestler of Croatian origin best known as Paul Diamond
- Vladimiro Boric Crnosija (1905–1973), Chilean clergyman and bishop of Croatian descent
- Ban Borić, Ban of Bosnia (1154–1163)
