= Subnitride =

Subnitrides are a class of nitrides wherein the electropositive element is in excess relative to the “normal” nitrides.

Examples of subnitrides include

- Dicyanoacetylene
- Na_{16}Ba_{6}N features a nitride-centered octahedral cluster of six barium atoms embedded in a matrix of sodium.
- Boron subnitrides (B_{13}N_{2}, B_{50}N_{2}, B_{6}N)
