= Diboron tetrafluoride =

Chemical compound

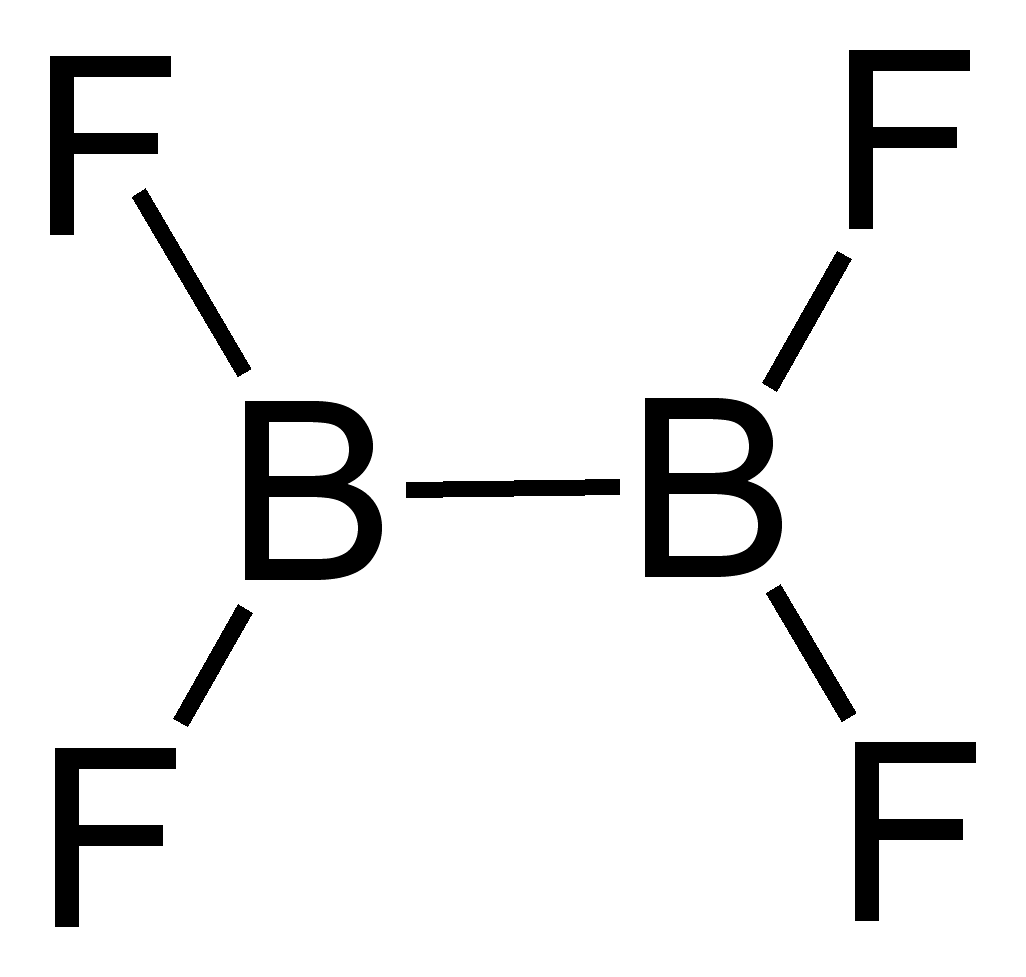

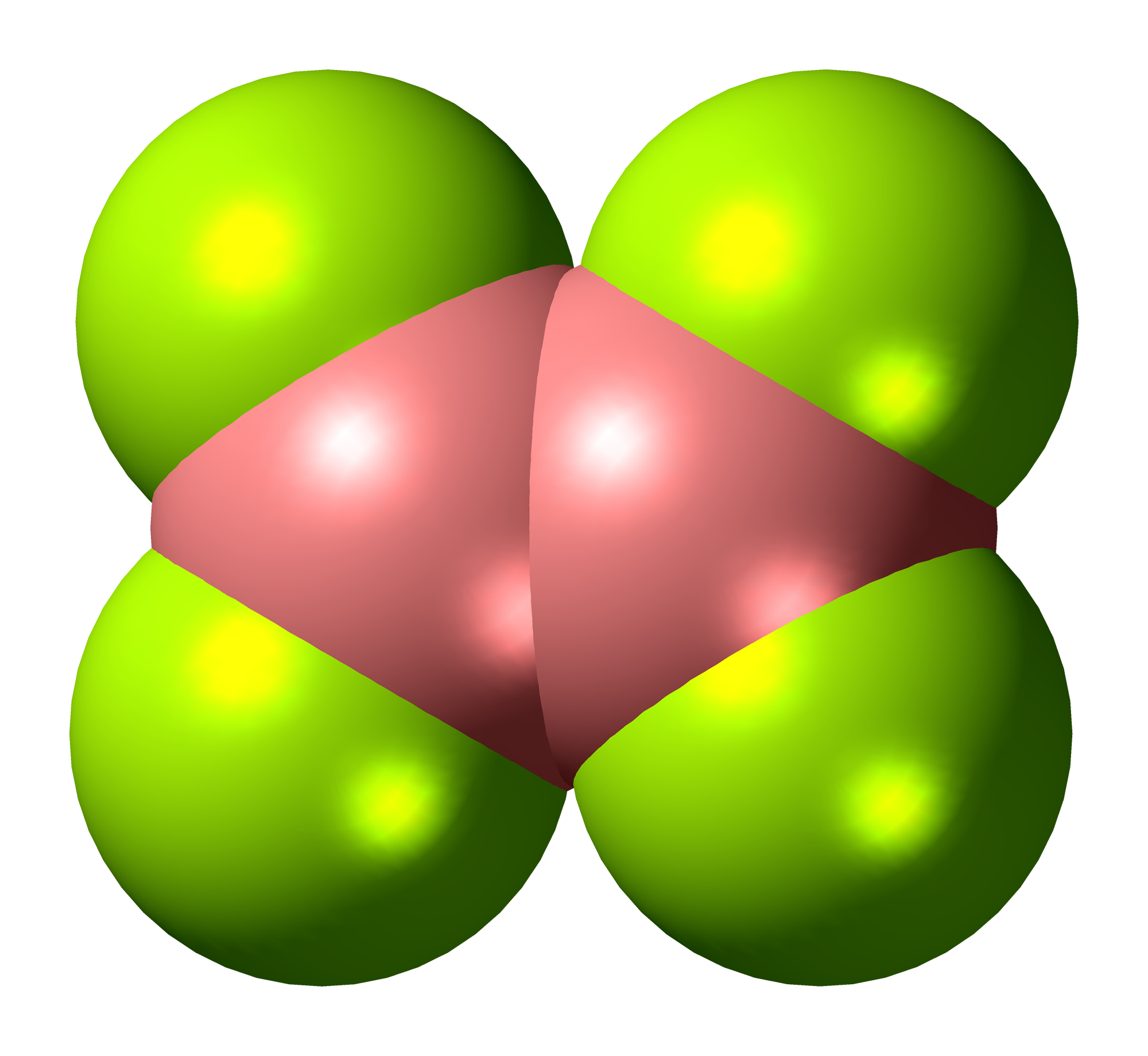

Names
- Preferred IUPAC name Diboron tetrafluoride
- Systematic IUPAC name Tetrafluorodiborane(4)

Identifiers
CAS Number	13965-73-6
3D model (JSmol)	Interactive image
ChemSpider	123165
PubChem CID	139653
CompTox Dashboard (EPA)	DTXSID80161143
- InChI: InChI=1S/B2F4/c3-1(4)2(5)6 Key: WUWOPJNIAKTBSJ-UHFFFAOYSA-N
- SMILES: FB(F)B(F)F

Properties
Chemical formula	B_{2}F_{4}
Molar mass	97.61 g·mol^{−1}
Appearance	Colorless gas
Density	4.3 kg/m^{3} (gas)
Melting point	−56 °C (−69 °F; 217 K)
Boiling point	−34 °C (−29 °F; 239 K)

Thermochemistry
Heat capacity (C)	79.1 J/mol K
Std molar entropy (S^{⦵}_{298})	317.3 J/mol K
Std enthalpy of formation (Δ_{f}H^{⦵}_{298})	−1440.1 kJ/mol
Gibbs free energy (Δ_{f}G^{⦵})	−1410.4 kJ/mol
- Except where otherwise noted, data are given for materials in their standard state (at 25 °C [77 °F], 100 kPa). Infobox references

Diboron tetrafluoride is the inorganic compound with the formula (BF_{2})_{2}, classed as a tetrahalodiborane. A colorless gas, the compound has a halflife of days at room temperature. It is the most stable of the diboron tetrahalides, and does not appreciably decompose under standard conditions.

== Structure and bonding ==
Diboron tetrafluoride is a planar molecule with a B-B bond distance of 172 pm. Although it is electron-deficient, the unsaturated boron centers are stabilized by pi-bonding with the terminal fluoride ligands. The compound is isoelectronic with oxalate.

== Synthesis and reactions ==
Diboron tetrafluoride can be formed by treating boron monofluoride with boron trifluoride at low temperatures, taking care not to form higher polymers. Alternatively, diboron tetrachloride can be fluorinated with antimony trifluoride.

Addition of diboron tetrafluoride to Vaska's complex was employed to produce an early example of a transition metal boryl complex:

2 B_{2}F_{4} + IrCl(CO)(PPh_{3})_{2} → Ir(BF_{2})_{3}(CO)(PPh_{3})_{2} + ClBF_{2}

== Historical literature ==
- Louis Trefonas and William N. Lipscomb (1958). "Crystal and Molecular Structure of Diboron Tetrafluoride, B_{2}F_{4}". J. Chem. Phys. 28 (1): 54–55. Bibcode:1958JChPh..28...54T. doi:10.1063/1.1744079.
- Gayles, J. N.; Self, J. (1964). "Infrared Spectrum of Diboron Tetrafluoride in the Gaseous and Solid States". Journal of Chemical Physics. 40 (12): 3530–3539. Bibcode:1964JChPh..40.3530G. doi:10.1063/1.1725048.
- A. K. Holliday; F. B. Taylor (1964). "Diboron tetrafluoride. Part II. Reactions with some oxides and organometallic compounds". J. Chem. Soc.: 2731–2734. doi:10.1039/JR9640002731.
- Vernon H. Dibeler; Susan K. Liston (1968). "Mass-spectrometric study of photoionization. XII. Boron trifluoride and diboron tetrafluoride". J. Chem. Soc. 7 (9): 1742–1746. doi:10.1021/ic50067a010.
