= Boron suboxide =

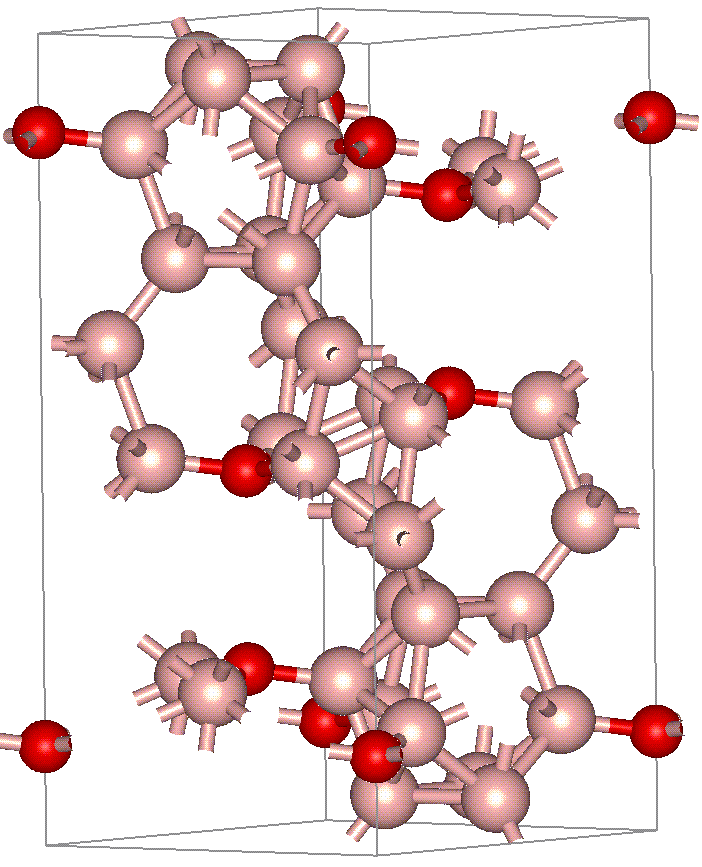

Names
- IUPAC name Boron suboxide
- Other names Hexaboron monoxide

Identifiers
3D model (JSmol)	Interactive image
- InChI: InChI=1S/6B.O Key: ULGXBKYAAIALFZ-UHFFFAOYSA-N
- SMILES: [B].[B].[B].[B].[B].[B].[O]

Properties
Chemical formula	B_{6}O
Molar mass	80.865 g/mol
Appearance	Reddish icosahedral twinned crystals
Density	2.56 g/cm^{3}
Melting point	2,000 °C (3,630 °F; 2,270 K)

Structure
Crystal structure	Rhombohedral, hR42
Space group	R3̅, No. 166
Lattice constant	a = 0.53824 nm, b = 0.53824 nm, c = 1.2322 nm α = 90°, β = 90°, γ = 120°
Formula units (Z)	6
- Except where otherwise noted, data are given for materials in their standard state (at 25 °C [77 °F], 100 kPa). verify (what is ?) Infobox references

Boron suboxide (chemical formula B_{6}O) is a solid compound with a structure built of eight icosahedra at the apexes of the rhombohedral unit cell. Each icosahedron is composed of twelve boron atoms. Two oxygen atoms are located in the interstices along the [111] rhombohedral direction. Due to its short interatomic bond lengths and strongly covalent character, B_{6}O displays a range of outstanding physical and chemical properties such as great hardness (close to that of rhenium diboride and boron nitride), low mass density, high thermal conductivity, high chemical inertness, and excellent wear resistance.

B_{6}O can be synthesized by reducing B_{2}O_{3} with boron or by oxidation of boron with zinc oxide or other oxidants. These boron suboxide materials formed at or near ambient pressure are generally oxygen deficient and non-stoichiometric (B_{6}O_{x}, x<0.9) and have poor crystallinity and very small grain size (less than 5 μm). High pressure applied during the synthesis of B_{6}O can significantly increase the crystallinity, oxygen stoichiometry, and crystal size of the products. Mixtures of boron and B_{2}O_{3} powders were usually used as starting materials in the reported methods for B_{6}O synthesis.

Oxygen-deficient boron suboxide (B_{6}O_{x}, x<0.9) might form icosahedral particles, which are neither single crystals nor quasicrystals, but twinned groups of twenty tetrahedral crystals.

B_{6}O of the α-rhombohedral boron type has been investigated because of its ceramic nature (hardness, high melting point, chemical stability, and low density) as a new structural material. In addition to this, these borides have unique bonding not easily accessible by the usual valence theory. Although an X-ray emission spectroscopic method indicated a probable parameter range for the oxygen site of B_{6}O, the correct oxygen position remained open to question until Rietveld analysis of X-ray diffraction profiles on B_{6}O powders were first carried out successfully, even though these were preliminary investigations.

== Preparation ==
B_{6}O can be prepared by three methods:

1. solid state reaction between B and B_{2}O_{3},
2. reduction of B_{2}O_{3} and
3. oxidation of B. The high vapor pressure of B_{2}O_{3} at elevated temperatures would cause the B excess composition in the process of the solid state reaction between B and B_{2}O_{3}.

In the reduction of B_{2}O_{3}, reductants that can be used include, but not limited to, Si and Mg which remain in B_{6}O as an impurity in the process. While in the oxidation process of B, oxidants such as ZnO would contaminate B_{6}O in the process.

== Physical properties ==
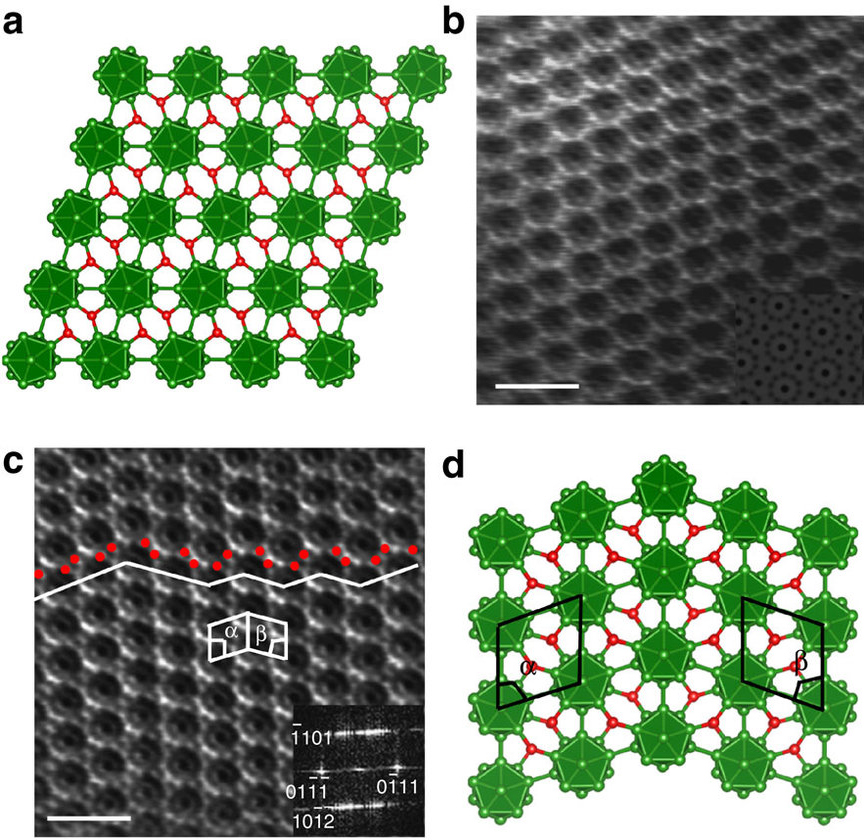
Atomic structure and electron micrographs of ideal (top) and twinned (bottom) B_{6}O. Green spheres are boron, red spheres are oxygen.

B_{6}O has a strong covalent nature and is easy to compose at temperatures greater than 1,973 K. Boron suboxide has also been reported to exhibit a wide range of superior properties such as high hardness with low density, high mechanical strength, oxidation resistance up to high temperatures as well as its high chemical inertness. Preliminary first-principle ab initio density functional calculations of the structural properties boron suboxide (B_{6}O) suggest that the strength of bonding in B_{6}O may be enhanced by the presence of a high electronegativity interstitial in the structure. The computational calculations confirm the shortening of covalent bonds, which is believed to favor higher elastic constants and hardness values.

== Applications ==
The potential applications of B_{6}O as a wear-reduction coating for high-speed cutting tools, abrasives, or other high-wear applications, for example, have been an object of intense interest in recent years. However, despite intensive research efforts commercial applications have yet to be realized. This is partly because of the low fracture toughness of the hot-pressed material and the considerable practical challenges associated with densifying stoichiometric B_{6}O material with good crystallinity. Furthermore, numerous mechanical properties of the material were until recently rather poorly understood.

Boron suboxide is also a promising body armor material, but its testing is still in the early stages and no commercial deployment is known as of November 2023. This seems to be due to the expense of synthesizing high-quality B_{6}O powder via the reaction of B_{2}O_{3} with B and further difficulties in densifying B_{6}O parts via standard industrial sintering and hot-pressing techniques.

== See also ==
- Suboxide
- Boron trioxide
- Boron monoxide
- Heterodiamond
- Beta carbon nitride
