= Diboron tetrachloride =

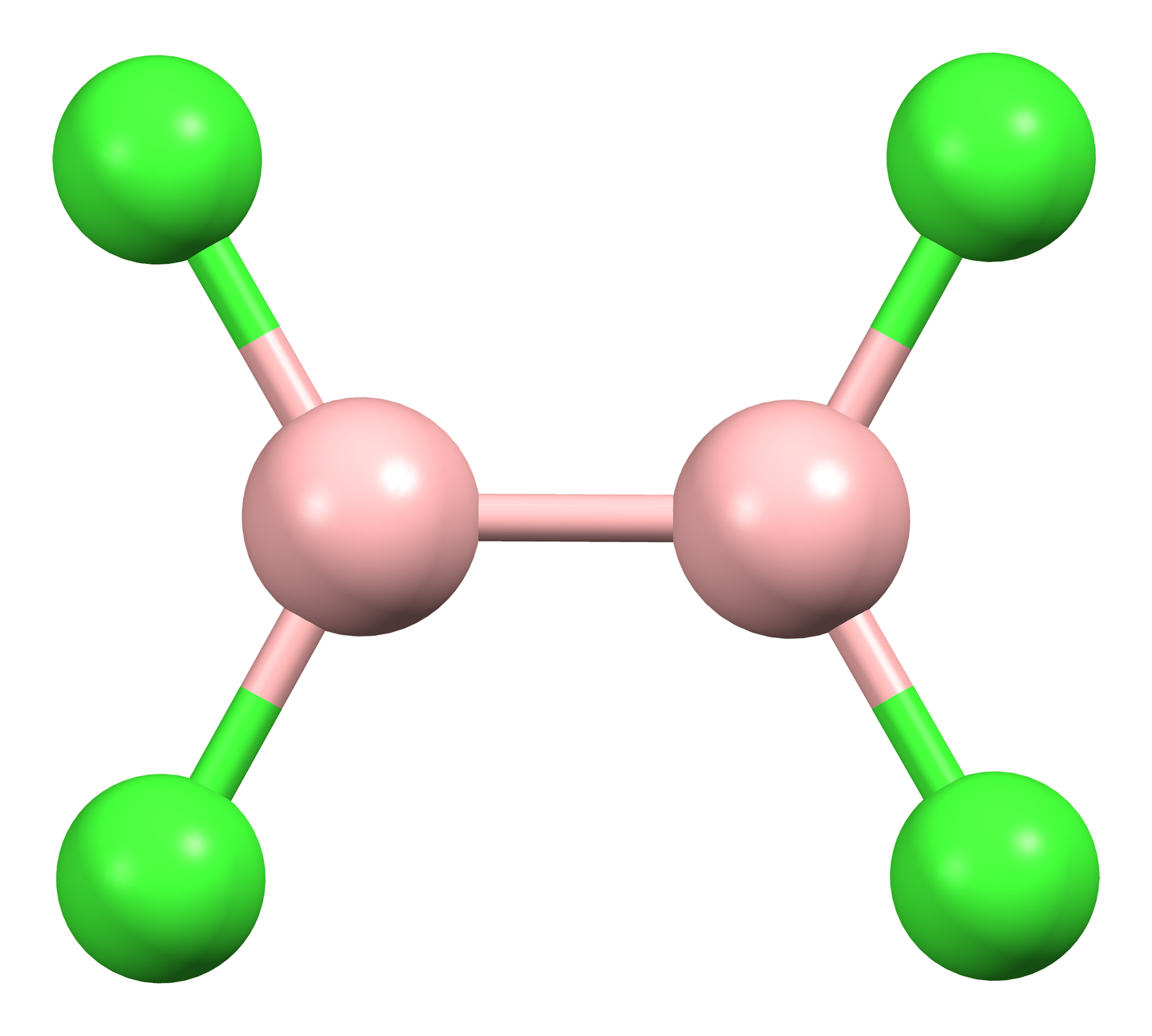

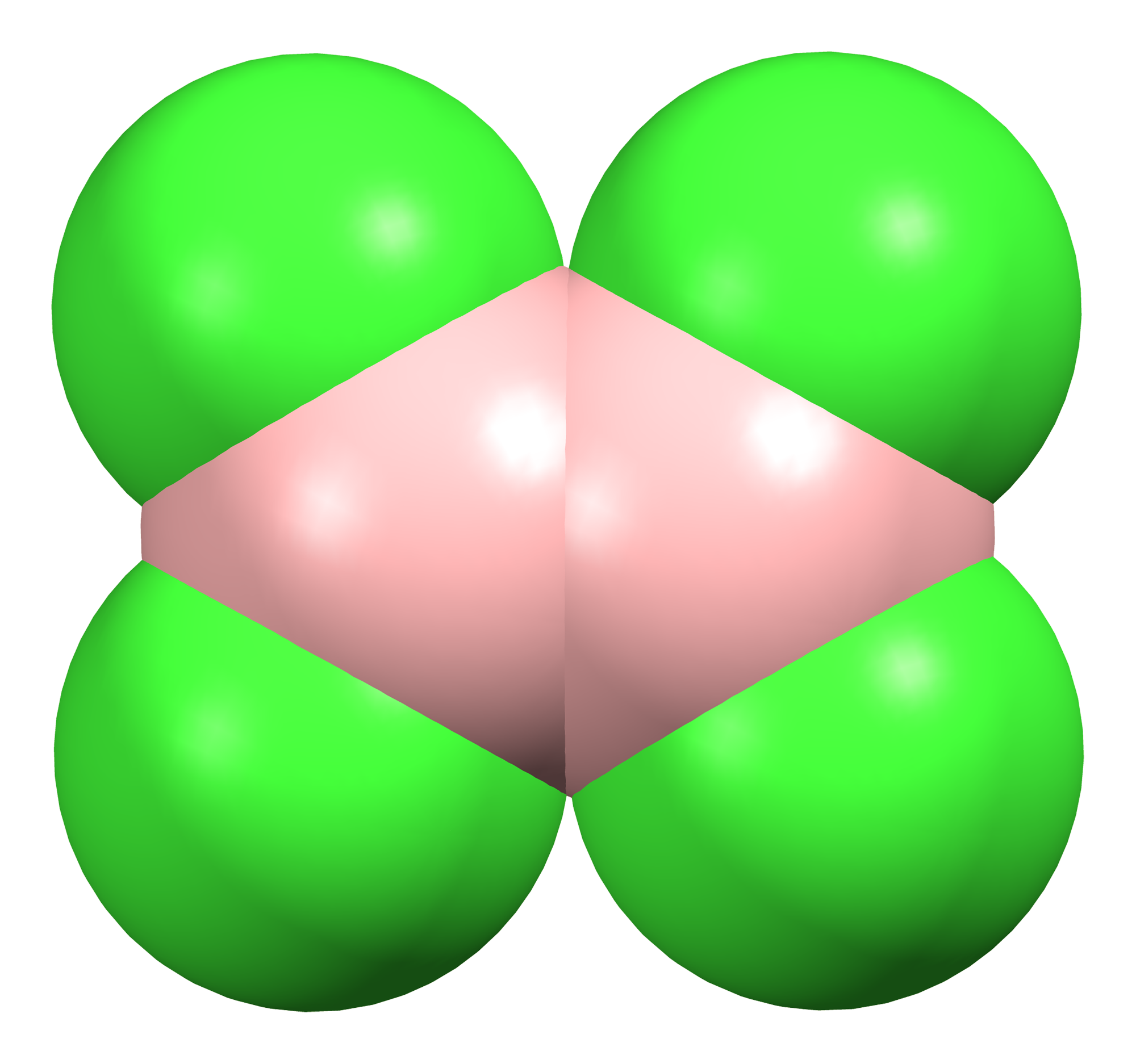

Names
- Preferred IUPAC name Diboron tetrachloride
- Systematic IUPAC name Tetrachlorodiborane(4)

Identifiers
| CAS Number | 13701-67-2 |
| 3D model (JSmol) | Interactive image |
| ChemSpider | 123068 |
| PubChem CID | 139548 |
| UNII | 3KKJ90L3I5 |
| CompTox Dashboard (EPA) | DTXSID40160031 |
- InChI: InChI=1S/B2Cl4/c3-1(4)2(5)6 Key: LCWVIHDXYOFGEG-UHFFFAOYSA-N; InChI=1S/B2Cl4/c3-1(4)2(5)6 Key: LCWVIHDXYOFGEG-UHFFFAOYAN
- SMILES: ClB(Cl)B(Cl)Cl

Properties
| Chemical formula | B_{2}Cl_{4} |
| Molar mass | 163.42 g·mol^{−1} |
| Appearance | colorless liquid |
| Density | 1.5 g/cm^{3} (0 °C) |
| Melting point | −92.6 °C (−134.7 °F; 180.6 K) |
| Boiling point | 65.5 °C (149.9 °F; 338.6 K) |

Thermochemistry
| Heat capacity (C) | 137.7 J/mol K |
| Std molar entropy (S^{⦵}_{298}) | 232.3 J/mol K |
| Std enthalpy of formation (Δ_{f}H^{⦵}_{298}) | −523 kJ/mol |
| Gibbs free energy (Δ_{f}G^{⦵}) | −468.8 kJ/mol |

Related compounds
| Related compounds | Diboron tetrafluoride |
- Except where otherwise noted, data are given for materials in their standard state (at 25 °C [77 °F], 100 kPa). Infobox references

Diboron tetrachloride is a tetrahalodiborane chemical compound with the formula B_{2}Cl_{4}. It is a colorless liquid.

== Synthesis ==
The modern synthesis involves the chlorination of diboron tetrabromide by gallium(III) chloride.

It can also be formed by the electrical discharge procedure of boron trichloride at low temperatures:

BCl_{3} → BCl_{2} + Cl
Cl + Hg (electrode) → Hg_{2}Cl_{2} or HgCl_{2}
2 BCl_{2} → B_{2}Cl_{4}

The most efficient synthesis technique uses no dechlorinating metal, instead passing radio-frequency alternating current through gaseous boron trichloride.

== Structure ==
The molecular structure of diboron tetrachloride, B_{2}Cl_{4}, was determined by gas electron diffraction. The molecules have D_{2d} symmetry, i.e. the two planar BBCl_{2} units are perpendicular to each other (torsion angle Cl-B-B-Cl 90°). The B-B distance is 1.70(4) Å, the B-Cl distance is 1.750(5) Å, the Cl-B-Cl angle is 118.7(3)°. B_{2}Cl_{4} thus differs significantly from B_{2}F_{4}, which is a planar molecule overall.

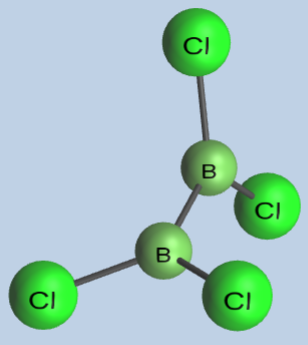
Structure of B_{2}Cl_{4} in the gas phase as determined by gas electron diffraction

== Reactions ==
The compound is used as a reagent for the synthesis of organoboron compounds. For instance, diboron tetrachloride adds to ethylene:

CH_{2}=CH_{2} + B_{2}Cl_{4} → Cl_{2}B–CH_{2}–CH_{2}–BCl_{2}

Diboron tetrachloride absorbs hydrogen quickly at room temperature:

3 B_{2}Cl_{4} + 3 H_{2} → B_{2}H_{6} + 4 BCl_{3}

With boranes, it replaces a hydrogen to form dichloroborane(3) and a polyhedral dichloroborane. Heat induces disproportionation back to boron trichloride and a polyhedral boron(I) chloride.
