= Boron trioxide =

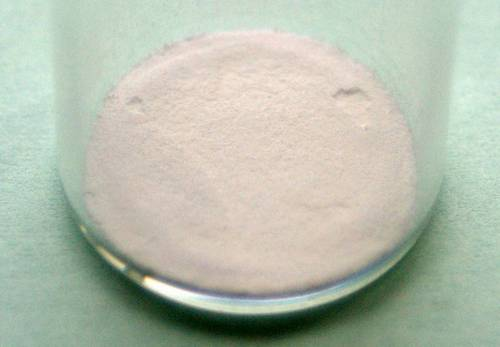
- Crystal structure of B_{2}O_{3}

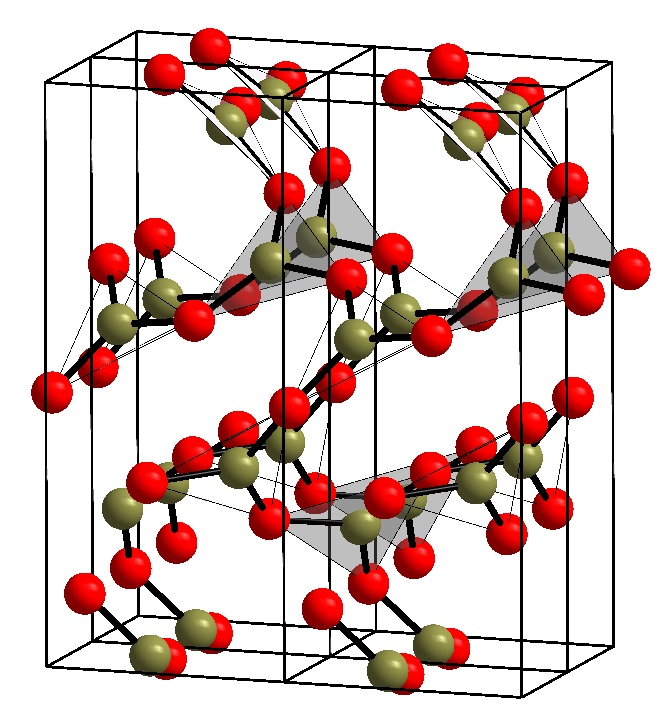

Names
- IUPAC name Diboron trioxide
- Other names boron oxide, diboron trioxide, boron sesquioxide, boric oxide, boria Boric anhydride

Identifiers
CAS Number	1303-86-2
3D model (JSmol)	Interactive image
ChEBI	CHEBI:30163
ChemSpider	452485
ECHA InfoCard	100.013.751
EC Number	215-125-8
Gmelin Reference	11108
PubChem CID	518682
RTECS number	ED7900000
UNII	483W67CPF4
CompTox Dashboard (EPA)	DTXSID7034387
- InChI: InChI=1S/B2O3/c3-1-5-2-4 Key: JKWMSGQKBLHBQQ-UHFFFAOYSA-N; InChI=1/B2O3/c3-1-5-2-4 Key: JKWMSGQKBLHBQQ-UHFFFAOYAI
- SMILES: O=BOB=O

Properties
Chemical formula	B_{2}O_{3}
Molar mass	69.6182 g/mol
Appearance	white, glassy solid
Density	2.460 g/cm^{3}, liquid; 2.55 g/cm^{3}, trigonal; 3.11–3.146 g/cm^{3}, monoclinic
Melting point	450 °C (842 °F; 723 K) (trigonal); 510 °C (tetrahedral)
Boiling point	1,860 °C (3,380 °F; 2,130 K) , sublimes at 1500 °C
Solubility in water	1.1 g/100mL (10 °C); 3.3 g/100mL (20 °C); 15.7 g/100mL (100 °C)
Solubility	partially soluble in methanol
Acidity (pK_{a})	~ 4
Magnetic susceptibility (χ)	−39.0·10^{−6} cm^{3}/mol

Thermochemistry
Heat capacity (C)	66.9 J/(mol⋅K)
Std molar entropy (S^{⦵}_{298})	80.8 J/(mol⋅K)
Std enthalpy of formation (Δ_{f}H^{⦵}_{298})	−1254 kJ/mol
Gibbs free energy (Δ_{f}G^{⦵})	−832 kJ/mol

Hazards
- Occupational safety and health (OHS/OSH)
Main hazards	Irritant
- GHS labelling
Pictograms	(GHS08: Health hazard)
Signal word	Danger
Hazard statements	H360FD
Precautionary statements	P201, P202, P281, P308+P313, P405, P501
NFPA 704 (fire diamond)	2 0 0
Flash point	noncombustible
- Lethal dose or concentration (LD, LC)
LD_{50} (median dose)	3163 mg/kg (oral, mouse)
- NIOSH (US health exposure limits)
PEL (Permissible)	TWA 15 mg/m^{3}
REL (Recommended)	TWA 10 mg/m^{3}
IDLH (Immediate danger)	2000 mg/m^{3}

Supplementary data page
- Boron trioxide (data page)
- Except where otherwise noted, data are given for materials in their standard state (at 25 °C [77 °F], 100 kPa). verify (what is ?) Infobox references

Boron trioxide or diboron trioxide is the oxide of boron with the formula B_{2}O_{3}. It is a colorless transparent solid, almost always glassy (amorphous), which can be crystallized only with great difficulty. It is also called boric oxide or boria. It has many important industrial applications, chiefly in ceramics as a flux for glazes and enamels and in the production of glasses.

== Structure ==
Boron trioxide has three known forms, one amorphous and two crystalline.

=== Amorphous form ===
The amorphous form (g-B_{2}O_{3}) is by far the most common. It is thought to be composed of boroxol rings which are six-membered rings composed of alternating 3-coordinate boron and 2-coordinate oxygen.

Because of the difficulty of building disordered models at the correct density with many boroxol rings, this view was initially controversial, but such models have recently been constructed and exhibit properties in excellent agreement with experiment. It is now recognized, from experimental and theoretical studies, that the fraction of boron atoms belonging to boroxol rings in glassy B_{2}O_{3} is somewhere between 0.73 and 0.83, with 0.75 = 3/4 corresponding to a 1:1 ratio between ring and non-ring units. The number of boroxol rings decays in the liquid state with increasing temperature.

=== Crystalline α form ===
The crystalline form (α-B_{2}O_{3}) is exclusively composed of BO_{3} triangles. Its crystal structure was initially believed to be the enantiomorphic space groups P3_{1}(#144) and P3_{2}(#145), like γ-glycine; but was later revised to the enantiomorphic space groups P3_{1}21(#152) and P3_{2}21(#154) in the trigonal crystal system, like α-quartz

Crystallization of α-B_{2}O_{3} from the molten state at ambient pressure is strongly kinetically disfavored (compare liquid and crystal densities). It can be obtained with prolonged annealing of the amorphous solid ~200 °C under at least 10 kbar of pressure.

=== Crystalline β form ===
The trigonal network undergoes a coesite-like transformation to monoclinic β-B_{2}O_{3} at several gigapascals (9.5 GPa).

== Preparation ==
Boron trioxide is produced by treating borax with sulfuric acid in a fusion furnace. At temperatures above 750 °C, the molten boron oxide layer separates out from sodium sulfate. It is then decanted, cooled and obtained in 96–97% purity.

Another method is heating boric acid above ~300 °C. Boric acid will initially decompose into steam, (H_{2}O_{(g)}) and metaboric acid (HBO_{2}) at around 170 °C, and further heating above 300 °C will produce more steam and diboron trioxide. The reactions are:

H_{3}BO_{3} → HBO_{2} + H_{2}O

2 HBO_{2} → B_{2}O_{3} + H_{2}O

Boric acid goes to anhydrous microcrystalline B_{2}O_{3} in a heated fluidized bed. Carefully controlled heating rate avoids gumming as water evolves.

Boron oxide will also form when diborane (B_{2}H_{6}) reacts with oxygen in the air or trace amounts of moisture:

2B_{2}H_{6}(g) + 3O_{2}(g) → 2B_{2}O_{3}(s) + 6H_{2}(g)

B_{2}H_{6}(g) + 3H_{2}O(g) → B_{2}O_{3}(s) + 6H_{2}(g)

== Reactions ==
Molten boron oxide attacks silicates. Containers can be passivated internally with a graphitized carbon layer obtained by thermal decomposition of acetylene.

== Applications ==
- Major component of borosilicate glass
- Fluxing agent for glass and enamels
- An additive used in glass fibres (optical fibres)
- The inert capping layer in the Liquid Encapsulation Czochralski process for the production of gallium arsenide single crystal
- As an acid catalyst in organic synthesis
- As a starting material for the production of other boron compounds, such as boron carbide

== See also ==
- Boron suboxide
- Boric acid
- Sassolite
- Tris(2,2,2-trifluoroethyl) borate
