= Boron monofluoride =

Names
- Other names Boron fluoride Boron(I) fluoride Fluoroboronene Fluoroborylene

Identifiers
CAS Number	13768-60-0
3D model (JSmol)	Interactive image; Interactive image; Interactive image
ChemSpider	4891729
ECHA InfoCard	100.033.970
EC Number	237-383-0
PubChem CID	6336604
UNII	N01K2O1ZJH
CompTox Dashboard (EPA)	DTXSID501317099
- InChI: InChI=1S/BF/c1-2 Key: YFSQMOVEGCCDJL-UHFFFAOYSA-N
- SMILES: [BH0]F; [B-]=[F+]; [B-2]#[F+2]

Properties
Chemical formula	BF
Molar mass	29.81 g·mol^{−1}

Thermochemistry
Std molar entropy (S^{⦵}_{298})	200.48 J K^{−1} mol^{−1}
Std enthalpy of formation (Δ_{f}H^{⦵}_{298})	115.90 kJ mol^{−1}

Related compounds
Related isoelectronic compounds	Carbon monoxide, dinitrogen, nitrosonium, cyanide, acetylide
Related compounds	aluminium monofluoride aluminium monochloride aluminium monoiodide gallium monofluoride
- Except where otherwise noted, data are given for materials in their standard state (at 25 °C [77 °F], 100 kPa). Infobox references

Boron monofluoride or fluoroborylene is a chemical compound with the formula BF, one atom of boron and one of fluorine. It is an unstable gas, but it is a stable ligand on transition metals, in the same way as carbon monoxide. It is a subhalide, containing fewer than the normal number of fluorine atoms, compared with boron trifluoride. It can also be called a borylene, as it contains boron with two unshared electrons. BF is isoelectronic with carbon monoxide and dinitrogen; each molecule has 14 electrons.

== Structure ==
The experimental B–F bond length is 1.26267 Å. Despite being isoelectronic to CO and N_{2}, each of which is typically described as having a triple bond, computational studies generally agree that the true bond order is much lower than 3. One reported computed bond order for the molecule is 1.4, compared with 2.6 for CO and 3.0 for N_{2}.

Lewis dot diagram structures show three formal alternatives for describing bonding in boron monofluoride.

BF is unusual in that the dipole moment is inverted, with fluorine having a positive charge even though it is the more electronegative element. This is explained by the 2sp orbitals of boron being reoriented and having a higher electron density. Backbonding, or the transfer of π orbital electrons for the fluorine atom, is not required to explain the polarization.

== Preparation ==
Boron monofluoride can be prepared by passing boron trifluoride gas at 2000 °C, at reduced pressure (below 1 mm Hg) over a boron rod. It can be condensed at liquid nitrogen temperatures (−196 °C).

== Properties ==
Boron monofluoride molecules have a dissociation energy of 7.8 eV or heat of formation −27.5±3 kcal/mole or 757±14 kJ/mol. The first ionization potential is 11.115 eV. The spectroscopic constants vibrational frequency ω_{e} of BF^{+} (X ^{2}Σ^{+}) is 1765 cm^{−1} and for neutral BF (X ^{1}Σ^{+}) it is 1402.1 cm^{−1}. The anharmonicity of BF is 11.84 cm^{−1}.

== Reactions ==
BF can react with itself to form polymers of boron containing fluorine with between 10 and 14 boron atoms. BF reacts with BF_{3} to form B_{2}F_{4}. BF and B_{2}F_{4} further combine to form B_{3}F_{5}. B_{3}F_{5} is unstable above −50 °C and forms B_{8}F_{12}. This substance is a yellow oil.

BF reacts with acetylenes to make the 1,4-diboracyclohexadiene ring system. BF can condense with 2-butyne forming 1,4-difluoro-2,3,5,6-tetramethyl-1,4-diboracyclohexadiene. Also, it reacts with acetylene to make 1,4-difluoro-1,4-diboracyclohexadiene. Propene reacts to make a mix of cyclic and non-cyclic molecules which may contain BF or BF_{2}.

BF hardly reacts with C_{2}F_{4} or SiF_{4}. BF does react with arsine, carbon monoxide, phosphorus trifluoride, phosphine, and phosphorus trichloride to make adducts like (BF_{2})_{3}B•AsH_{3}, (BF_{2})_{3}B•CO, (BF_{2})_{3}B•PF_{3}, (BF_{2})_{3}B•PH_{3}, and (BF_{2})_{3}B•PCl_{3}.

BF reacts with oxygen: BF + O_{2} → OBF + O; with chlorine: BF + Cl_{2} → ClBF + Cl; and with nitrogen dioxide BF + NO_{2} → OBF + NO.

== Ligand ==
A naïve analysis would suggest that BF is isoelectronic with carbon monoxide (CO) and so could form similar compounds to metal carbonyls. As discussed above (see: § Structure), BF has a much lower bond order, so that the valence shell around boron is unfilled. Consequently, BF as a ligand is much more Lewis acidic; it tends to form higher-order bonds to metal centers, and can also bridge between two or three metal atoms (μ_{2} and μ_{3}).

Working with BF as a ligand is difficult due to its instability in the free state. Instead, most routes tend to use derivatives of BF_{3} that decompose once coordinated.

In a 1968 conference report, Kämpfer et al claimed to produce Fe(BF)(CO)_{4} via reaction of B_{2}F_{4} with Fe(CO)_{5}, but modern chemists have not reproduced the synthesis, and the original compound has no crystallographic characterization. The first modern demonstration of BF coordinated to a transition element is due to Vidovic and Aldrige, who produced [(C_{5}H_{5})Ru(CO)_{2}]_{2}(μ_{2}-BF) (with BF bridging both ruthenium atoms) in 2009. To make the compound, Vidovic and Aldridge reacted NaRu(CO)_{2}(C_{5}H_{5}) with (Et_{2}O)·BF_{3}; the boron monofluoride ligand then formed in-place.

Vidovic and Aldridge also developed a substance with the formula (PF_{3})_{4}FeBF by reacting iron vapour with B_{2}F_{4} and PF_{3}. Hafnium, thorium, titanium, and zirconium can form a difluoride with a BF ligand at the low temperature of 6K. These come about by reacting the atomic metal with BF_{3}.

The first fully characterized molecule featuring BF as a terminal ligand was synthesized by Drance and Figueroa in 2019, by sterically hindering the formation of a dimer. In the molecule, boron is double-bonded to iron.

FBScF_{2}, FBYF_{2}, FBLaF_{2}, and FBCeF_{2} have been prepared in a solid neon matrix by reacting atomic metals with boron trifluoride.
