= Foxtel Box Office =

- Country: Australia

Programming
- Language(s): English
- Picture format: 576i (SDTV); 1080i (HDTV)

Ownership
- Owner: Foxtel

History
- Launched: March 2004
- Closed: 11 October 2017

Links
- Website: foxtel.com.au

Foxtel Box Office was one of Foxtel's Pay Per View systems, which showed movies. It had 14 channels. Films came to Foxtel Box Office same day as DVD or 1–3 months after DVD release

The service closed on 11 October 2017.
