= Olga Boric-Lubecke =

American academic

Olga Boric-Lubecke is a Professor of electrical engineering at the University of Hawaiʻi at Mānoa. She was named Fellow of the Institute of Electrical and Electronics Engineers (IEEE) in 2015 for "contributions to biomedical microwave technology". She co-founded Adnoviv, a startup working with sensor technology, in 2013 with her colleague Victor Lubecke.

== Education ==
Professor Boric-Lubecke received her Bachelor's degree from University of Belgrade in 1989 and her Master's degree from California Institute of Technology in 1990. She got her Ph.D. degree from the University of California, Los Angeles, in 1995. All her degrees are in electrical engineering.

== Work ==
Professor Boric-Lubecke has been at the University of Hawaiʻi at Mānoa since 2003. Prior to this, she worked at Bell Labs, NASA's Jet Propulsion Laboratory, and the Institute of Physical and Chemical Research. Her current research interests include silicon RF integrated circuits, high-frequency integrated circuits, biomedical applications, and renewable energy.

She has also founded or co-founded a number of startups such as Adnoviv and Kai Medical. Adnoviv works to create sensors and develop sensor technology for industrial, medical and security applications. Her other startup, Kai Medical, works to develop medical technology. Professor Boric-Lubecke was also the Chief Scientific Advisor for the latter company.

== Awards ==
Professor Boric-Lubecke was a co-recipient of the Emerging Technology Award at TechConnect in 2007.

She has received several Awards from the IEEE Microwave Theory and Techniques Society (IEEE MTT-S), as well as the IEEE Engineering in Medicine and Biology Society (EMB-S).
