= Victor Lubecke =

- Occupation: electrical engineer
- Employer: University of Hawaii at Manoa
- Notable work: microwave transducers in medicine
- Awards: IEEE Fellow

Victor Lubecke is an electrical engineer at the University of Hawaii at Manoa, Honolulu. He was named a Fellow of the Institute of Electrical and Electronics Engineers (IEEE) in 2016 for his leadership in the development of microwave transducers for biomedical application.
