= Tetraboric acid =

Names
- IUPAC name: 3,7-Dihydroxy-2,4,6,8,9-pentaoxa-1,3,5,7-tetraborabicyclo[3.3.1]nonane; Pyroboric acid

Identifiers
CAS Number	12447-38-0
3D model (JSmol)	Interactive image
ChemSpider	450911
PubChem CID	516845
CompTox Dashboard (EPA)	DTXSID801014359
- InChI: InChI=1S/B4H2O7/c5-1-9-3(7)11-4(8)10-2-6/h7-8H Key: RTANKYMJXZNJGQ-UHFFFAOYSA-N
- SMILES: OB(OB=O)OB(O)OB=O

Properties
Chemical formula	B_{4}H_{2}O_{7}
Molar mass	157.25 g·mol^{−1}
Appearance	white solid
Melting point	236 °C (457 °F; 509 K)
Conjugate base	Tetraborate

Hazards
- GHS labelling
Signal word	Warning
- Except where otherwise noted, data are given for materials in their standard state (at 25 °C [77 °F], 100 kPa). Infobox references

Tetraboric acid or pyroboric acid is a chemical compound with empirical formula H_{2}B_{4}O_{7}. It is a colourless water-soluble solid formed by the dehydration or polymerization boric acid.

Tetraboric acid is formally the parent acid of the tetraborate anion [B_{4}O_{7}]^{2−}.

== Preparation ==
Tetraboric acid can be obtained by heating orthoboric acid B(OH)_{3} above about 170 °C:

4 B(OH)_{3} → H_{2}B_{4}O_{7} + 5 H_{2}O
