= Metaboric acid =

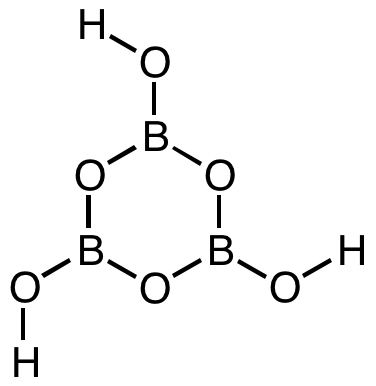

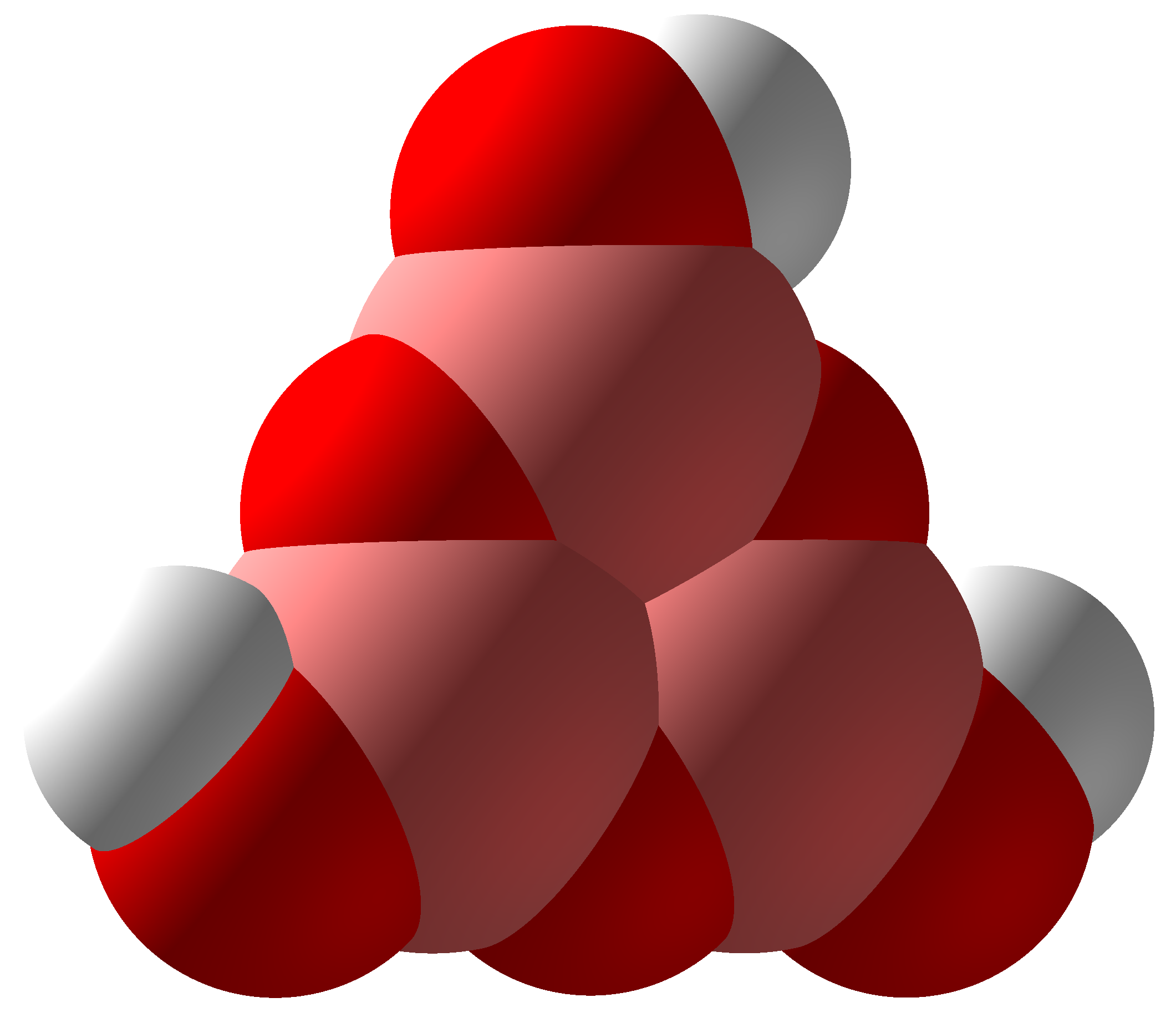

Names
- IUPAC name Oxoborinic acid
- Other names Metaboric acid

Identifiers
CAS Number	13460-51-0
3D model (JSmol)	Interactive image; Interactive image
ChemSpider	22900
ECHA InfoCard	100.033.313
EC Number	236-659-8
Gmelin Reference	121829
PubChem CID	24492
CompTox Dashboard (EPA)	DTXSID6065478
- InChI: InChI=1S/BHO2/c2-1-3/h2H Key: VGTPKLINSHNZRD-UHFFFAOYSA-N
- SMILES: O=BO; OB1OB(O)OB(O)O1

Properties
Chemical formula	B_{3}H_{3}O_{6}
Molar mass	131.45 g·mol^{−1}
Appearance	white solid
Density	1.784 g/cm^{3}
Melting point	176 °C (349 °F; 449 K)
Acidity (pK_{a})	9.236
Conjugate base	Metaborate

Structure
Coordination geometry	trigonal at B

Hazards
- GHS labelling
Pictograms	(GHS07: Exclamation mark)
Signal word	Warning
Hazard statements	H315, H319, H335
Precautionary statements	P261, P305+P351+P338
- Except where otherwise noted, data are given for materials in their standard state (at 25 °C [77 °F], 100 kPa). Infobox references

Metaboric acid is the name for a family of inorganic compounds with the same empirical formula HBO_{2} that differ in their molecular structure. They are colourless water-soluble solids formed by the dehydration or decomposition of boric acid.

Metaboric acid is formally the parent acid of the metaborate anions.

Metaboric acid occurs naturally as the mineral metaborite and its monoclinic dimorph clinometaborite.

== Structure ==
The main forms of metaboric acid are:

- Modification III, or trimeric, with the molecular formula H_{3}B_{3}O_{6}. The molecule has C_{3h} symmetry, with a six-member ring of alternating boron and oxygen atoms at the core, with OH groups attached to the borons. The crystal structure is orthorhombic with a sheet-like structure, similar to that of boric acid itself. It is obtained by heating orthoboric acid at 80-100 °C, with loss of water:

3 B(OH)_{3} → (BOH)_{3}O_{3} + 3 H_{2}O

- Modification II. A polymer with structure similar to modification III, except that the rings are connected and 1/3 of the boron centres are tetrahedral. The molecular formula is therefore HO[−B(BOH)_{2}O_{3}O−]_{n}H The crystal structure is monoclinic. This form has a higher melting point (201 °C) and density (2.045 g/cm^{3}) It is obtained by heating the trimeric form at 130-140 °C in a sealed ampoule (to prevent dehydration), orthorhombic metaboric acid converts to the monoclinic form (II):

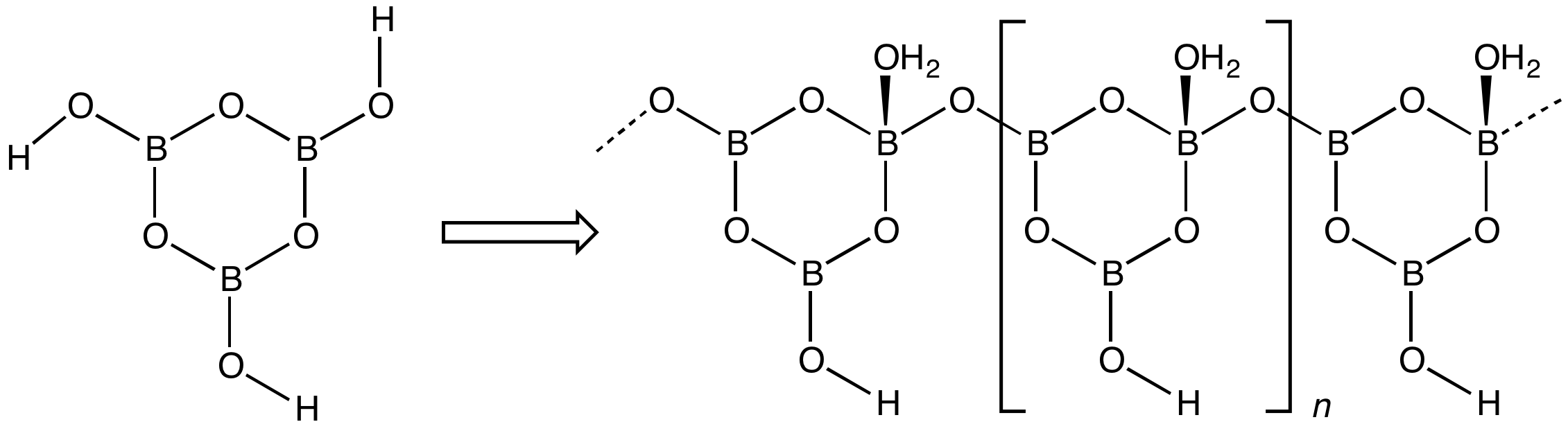
Conversion of orthorhombic to monoclinic metaboric acid.

- Cubic form. It is a white solid and is only slightly soluble in water that melts at about 236 °C. It is obtained by heating either modification II or III above 140 °C.

== Reactions ==
When heated above about 170 °C, metaboric acid dehydrates, forming tetraboric acid, also called pyroboric acid (H_{2}B_{4}O_{7}):

4 HBO_{2} → H_{2}B_{4}O_{7} + H_{2}O

== Metaborates ==
Metaborates are derivatives of BO_{2}^{−}. Like metaboric acid, the metaborates exist with disparate structures. Examples are sodium and potassium metaborates, salts formed by deprotonation of orthorhombic metaboric acid containing the cyclic B_{3}O_{6}^{3−} ion and calcium metaborate, Ca(BO_{2})_{2}, which contains the chain polymeric ion (BO_{2}^{−})_{n}.
