= Boric acid =

Weak acid with formula H3BO3

Orthoboric acid
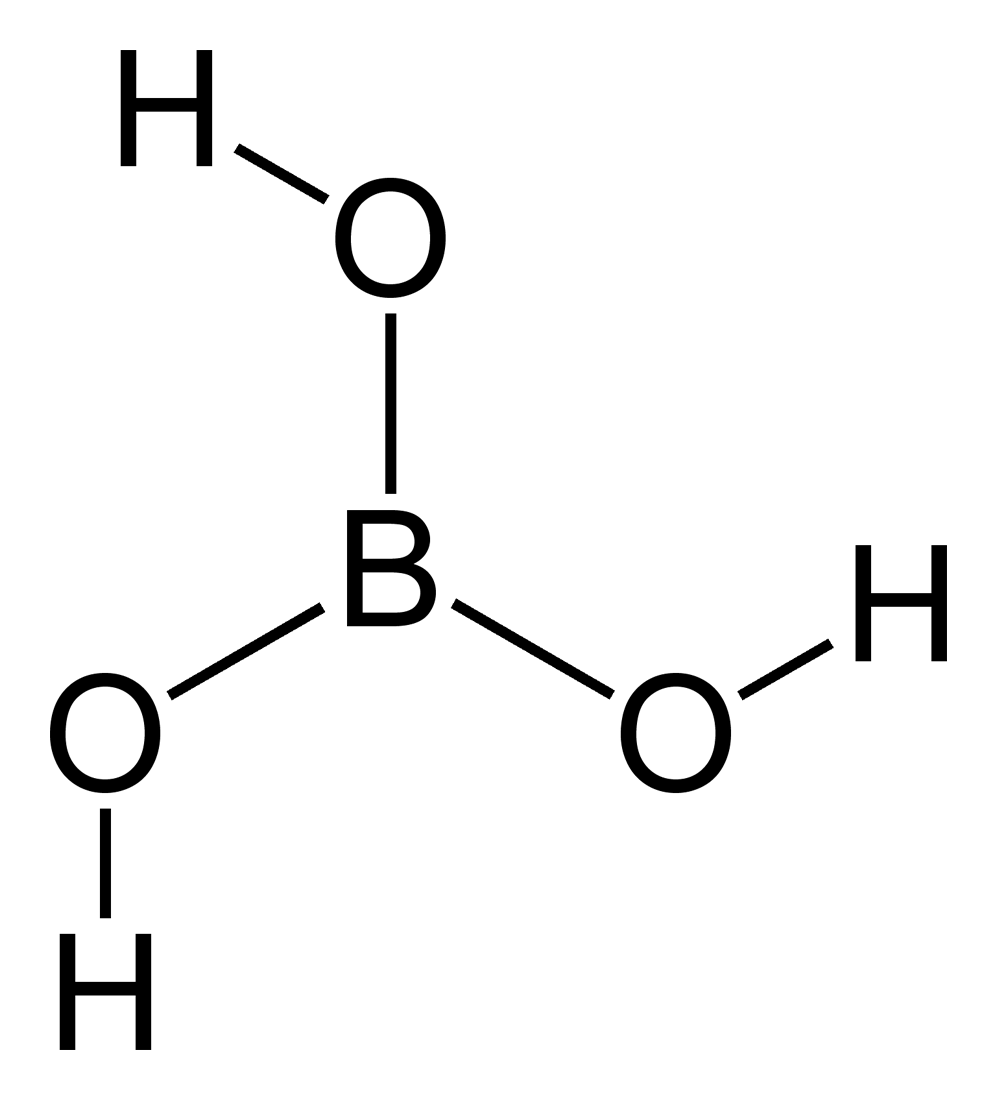
Structural formula
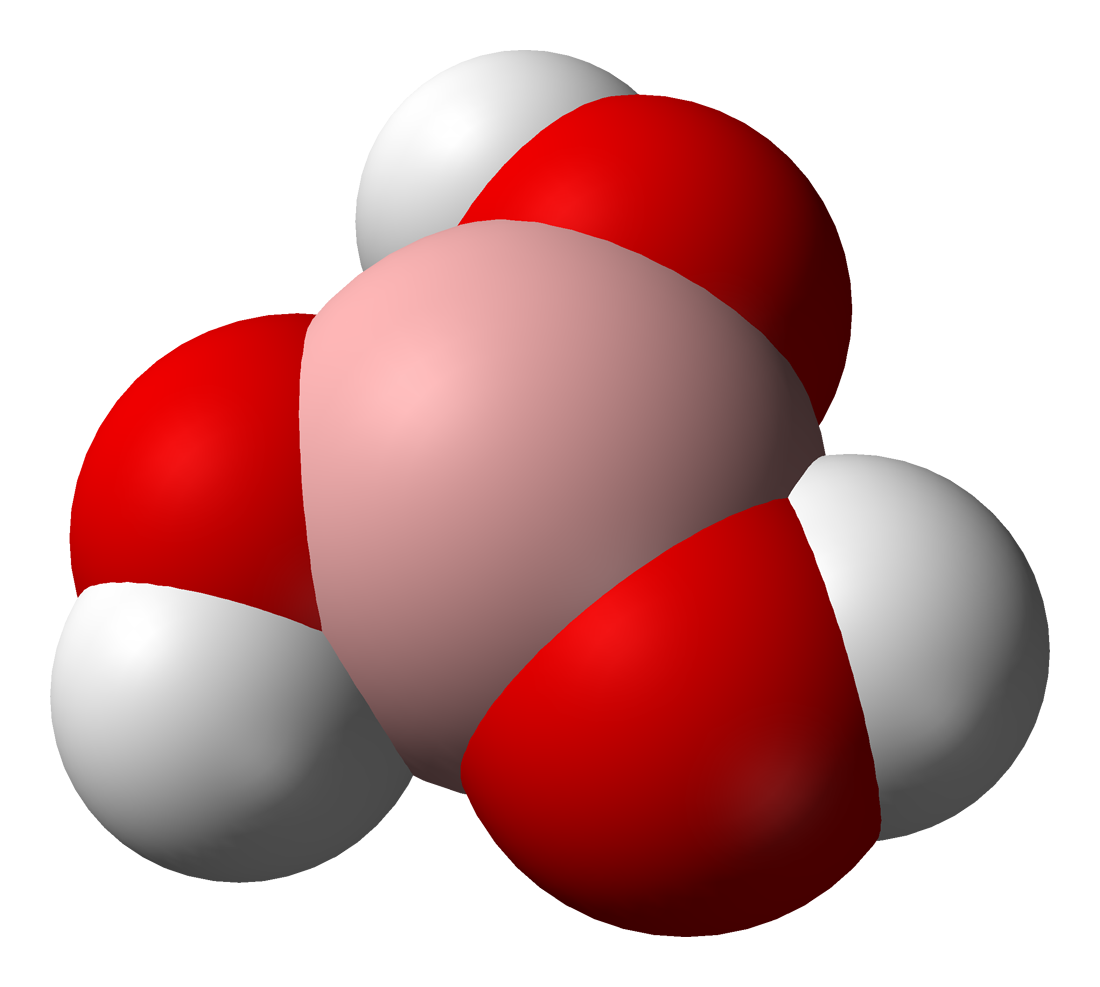
Space-filling model
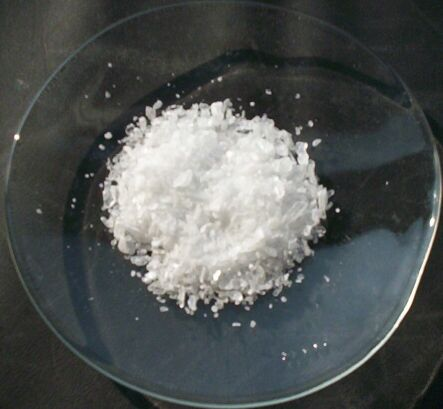
- Boric acid crystals

Names
- IUPAC name Boric acid
- Other names Orthoboric acid, Boracic acid, Sassolite, Borofax, Trihydroxyborane, Boranetriol, Hydrogen borate, Acidum boricum

Identifiers
CAS Number	10043-35-3
3D model (JSmol)	Interactive image; Interactive image
ChEBI	CHEBI:33118
ChEMBL	ChEMBL42403
ChemSpider	7346
ECHA InfoCard	100.030.114
EC Number	233-139-2
E number	E284 (preservatives)
KEGG	D01089
PubChem CID	7628
UNII	R57ZHV85D4
CompTox Dashboard (EPA)	DTXSID1020194
- InChI: InChI=1S/BH3O3/c2-1(3)4/h2-4H Key: KGBXLFKZBHKPEV-UHFFFAOYSA-N; InChI=1/BH3O3/c2-1(3)4/h2-4H Key: KGBXLFKZBHKPEV-UHFFFAOYAI
- SMILES: OB(O)O; [OH+]=[B-](O)O

Properties
Chemical formula	BH_{3}O_{3}
Molar mass	61.83 g·mol^{−1}
Appearance	White crystalline solid
Density	1.435 g/cm^{3}
Melting point	170.9 °C (339.6 °F; 444.0 K)
Boiling point	300 °C (572 °F; 573 K)
Solubility in water	2.52 g/100 mL (0 °C); 4.72 g/100 mL (20 °C); 5.7 g/100 mL (25 °C); 19.10 g/100 mL (80 °C); 27.53 g/100 mL (100 °C)
Solubility in other solvents	Soluble in lower alcohols moderately soluble in pyridine very slightly soluble in acetone
log P	−0.29
Acidity (pK_{a})	9.24 (first proton), 12.4 (second), 13.3 (complete)
Conjugate base	Borate
Magnetic susceptibility (χ)	−34.1·10^{−6} cm^{3}/mol

Structure
Molecular shape	Trigonal planar
Dipole moment	0 D

Pharmacology
ATC code	S02AA03 (WHO) D08AD (WHO)

Hazards
- GHS labelling
Pictograms	(GHS08: Health hazard)
NFPA 704 (fire diamond)	1 0 0
Flash point	Nonflammable
- Lethal dose or concentration (LD, LC)
LD_{50} (median dose)	2660 mg/kg, oral (rat)

Related compounds
Related compounds	Boron trioxide Borax

Supplementary data page
- Boric acid (data page)
- Except where otherwise noted, data are given for materials in their standard state (at 25 °C [77 °F], 100 kPa). verify (what is ?) Infobox references

Boric acid, more specifically orthoboric acid, is a compound of boron, oxygen, and hydrogen with formula B(OH)_{3}. It may also be called hydrogen orthoborate, trihydroxidoboron or boracic acid. It is usually encountered as colorless crystals or a white powder, that dissolves in water, and occurs in nature as the mineral sassolite. It is a weak acid that yields various borate anions and salts, and can react with alcohols to form borate esters.

Boric acid is often used as an antiseptic, insecticide, flame retardant, neutron absorber, or precursor to other boron compounds.

The term "boric acid" is also used generically for any oxyacid of boron, such as metaboric acid HBO_{2} and tetraboric acid H_{2}B_{4}O_{7}.

== History ==
Orthoboric acid was first prepared by Wilhelm Homberg (1652–1715) from borax, by the action of mineral acids, and was given the name sal sedativum Hombergi ("sedative salt of Homberg"). However, boric acid and borates have been used since the ancient history for cleaning, preserving food, and other uses.

== Molecular and crystal structure ==
The three oxygen atoms form a trigonal planar geometry around the boron. The B-O bond length is 136 pm, and the O-H is 97 pm. The molecular point group is C_{3h}.

Two crystalline forms of orthoboric acid are known: triclinic with space group P1̅, and trigonal with space group P3_{2}. The former is the most common; the second, which is a bit more stable thermodynamically, can be obtained with a special preparation method.

The triclinic form of boric acid consists of layers of B(OH)_{3} molecules held together by hydrogen bonds with an O...O separation of 272 pm. The distance between two adjacent layers is 318 pm. While the layers of the triclinic phase are nearly trigonal with γ = 119.76°, a = 701.87 pm, and b = 703.5 pm (compared to a = 704.53(4) pm for the trigonal form), the stacking of the layers is somewhat offset in the triclinic phase, with α = 92.49° and β = 101.46°. The triclinic phase has c = 634.72 pm and the trigonal phase has a = 956.08(7) pm.

The unit cell of boric acid	hydrogen bonding (dashed lines) allows boric acid molecules to form parallel layers in the solid state

== Preparation ==
Boric acid may be prepared by reacting borax (sodium tetraborate decahydrate) with a mineral acid, such as hydrochloric acid:

Na_{2}B_{4}O_{7}·10H_{2}O + 2 HCl → 4 B(OH)_{3} + 2 NaCl + 5 H_{2}O

It is also formed as a byproduct of hydrolysis of boron trihalides and diborane:

B_{2}H_{6} + 6 H_{2}O → 2 B(OH)_{3} + 6 H_{2}

BX_{3} + 3 H_{2}O → B(OH)_{3} + 3 HX (X = Cl, Br, I)

== Reactions ==
=== Pyrolysis ===
When heated, orthoboric acid undergoes a three-step dehydration. The reported transition temperatures vary substantially from source to source.

When heated above 140 °C, orthoboric acid yields metaboric acid (HBO_{2}) with loss of one water molecule:

B(OH)_{3} → HBO_{2} + H_{2}O

Heating metaboric acid above about 180 °C eliminates another water molecule forming tetraboric acid, also called pyroboric acid (H_{2}B_{4}O_{7}):

4 HBO_{2} → H_{2}B_{4}O_{7} + H_{2}O

Further heating (to about 530 °C) leads to boron trioxide:

H_{2}B_{4}O_{7} → 2 B_{2}O_{3} + H_{2}O

=== Aqueous solution ===
When orthoboric acid is dissolved in water, it partially dissociates to give metaboric acid:

B(OH)_{3} ⇌ HBO_{2} + H_{2}O

The solution is mildly acidic due to the ionization of the acids:

B(OH)_{3} + H_{2}O ⇌ [BO(OH)_{2}]^{−} + H_{3}O^{+}
HBO_{2} + H_{2}O ⇌ [BO_{2}]^{−} + H_{3}O^{+}

However, Raman spectroscopy of strongly alkaline solutions has shown the presence of [B(OH)_{4}]^{−} ions, leading some to conclude that the acidity is exclusively due to the abstraction of OH^{−} from water:

B(OH)_{3} + HO^{−} ⇌ B(OH)^{−}_{4}

Equivalently,

B(OH)_{3} + H_{2}O ⇌ B(OH)^{−}_{4} + H^{+} (K_{a} = 7.3×10^{−10}; pK_{a} = 9.14)

Or, more properly,

B(OH)_{3} + 2 H_{2}O ⇌ B(OH)^{−}_{4} + H_{3}O^{+}

This reaction occurs in two steps, with the neutral complex aquatrihydroxyboron B(OH)_{3}(OH_{2}) as an intermediate:

B(OH)_{3} + H_{2}O → B(OH)_{3}(OH_{2})
B(OH)_{3}(OH_{2}) + H_{2}O → [B(OH)_{4}]^{−} + H_{3}O^{+}

This reaction may be characterized as Lewis acidity of boron toward HO^{−}, rather than as Brønsted acidity. However, some of its behaviour towards some chemical reactions suggest it to be a tribasic acid in the Brønsted-Lowry sense as well.

Boric acid, mixed with borax Na_{2}B_{4}O_{7}·10H_{2}O (more properly Na_{2}B_{4}O_{5}(OH)_{4}·8H_{2}O) in the weight ratio of 4:5, is highly soluble in water, though they are not so soluble separately.

=== Sulfuric acid solution ===
Boric acid also dissolves in anhydrous sulfuric acid according to the equation:

B(OH)_{3} + 6 H_{2}SO_{4} → [B(SO_{4}H)_{4}]^{−} + 2 [HSO_{4}]^{−} + 3 H_{3}O^{+}

The product is an extremely strong acid, even stronger than the original sulfuric acid.

=== Esterification ===
Boric acid reacts with alcohols to form borate esters, B(OR)_{3} where R is alkyl or aryl. The reaction is typically driven by a dehydrating agent, such as concentrated sulfuric acid:

B(OH)_{3} + 3 ROH → B(OR)_{3} + 3 H_{2}O

=== With vicinal diols ===
The acidity of boric acid solutions is considerably increased in the presence of cis-vicinal diols (organic compounds containing similarly oriented hydroxyl groups in adjacent carbon atoms, (R_{1},R_{2})=C(OH)−C(OH)=(R_{3},R_{4})) such as glycerol and mannitol.

The tetrahydroxyborate anion formed in the dissolution spontaneously reacts with these diols to form relatively stable anion esters containing one or two five-member −B−O−C−C−O− rings. For example, the reaction with mannitol H(HCOH)_{6}H, whose two middle hydroxyls are in cis orientation, can be written as:

B(OH)_{3} + H_{2}O ⇌ [B(OH)_{4}]^{−} + H^{+}

[B(OH)_{4}]^{−} + H(HCOH)_{6}H ⇌ [B(OH)_{2}(H(HCOH)_{2}(HCO−)_{2}(HCOH)_{2}H)]^{−} + 2 H_{2}O

[B(OH)_{2}(H(HCOH)_{2}(HCO−)_{2}(HCOH)_{2}H)]^{−} + H(HCOH)_{6}H ⇌ [B(H(HCOH)_{2}(HCO−)_{2}(HCOH)_{2}H)_{2}]^{−} + 2 H_{2}O

Giving the overall reaction:

B(OH)_{3} + 2 H(HCOH)_{6}H ⇌ [B(H(HCOH)_{2}(HCO−)_{2}(HCOH)_{2}H)_{2}]^{−} + 3 H_{2}O + H^{+}

The stability of these mannitoborate ester anions shifts the equilibrium to the right, thereby increasing the solution's acidity by five orders of magnitude compared to that of pure boric oxide. This lowers the pK_{a} from 9 to below 4 for a sufficient concentration of mannitol. The resulting solution is referred to as mannitoboric acid.

The addition of mannitol to an initially neutral solution containing boric acid or simple borates lowers its pH enough for it to be titrated by a strong base such as NaOH, including with an automated potentiometric titrator. This property is used in analytical chemistry to determine the borate content of aqueous solutions, for example to monitor the depletion of boric acid by neutrons in the water of the primary circuit of light-water reactor when the compound is added as a neutron poison during refueling operations.

== Toxicology ==
Based on mammalian median lethal dose (LD_{50}) rating of 2.66 g/kg body mass, boric acid is only poisonous if taken internally or inhaled in large quantities. The Fourteenth Edition of the Merck Index indicates that the LD_{50} of boric acid is 5.14 g/kg for oral dosages given to rats, and that 5 to 20 g/kg has produced death in adult humans. For a 70 kg adult, at the lower 5 g/kg limit, 350 g could produce death in humans. For comparison's sake, the LD_{50} of table salt is reported to be 3.75 g/kg in rats according to the Merck Index. According to the Agency for Toxic Substances and Disease Registry, "The minimal lethal dose of ingested boron (as boric acid) was reported to be 2–3 g in infants, 5–6 g in children, and 15–20 g in adults. [...] However, a review of 784 human poisonings with boric acid (10–88 g) reported no fatalities, with 88% of cases being asymptomatic." Human studies in three borate exposure-rich comparison groups (U.S. Borax mine and production facility workers, Chinese boron workers, Turkish residents living near boron-rich regions) produced no indicators of developmental toxicity in blood and semen tests. The highest estimated exposure was 5 mg B/kg/day, likely due to eating in contaminated workplaces, more than 100 times the average daily exposure.

Long-term exposure to boric acid may be of more concern, causing kidney damage and eventually kidney failure (see links below). Although it does not appear to be carcinogenic, studies in dogs have reported testicular atrophy after exposure to 32 mg/(kg⋅day) for 90 days. This level, were it applicable to humans at like dose, would equate to a cumulative dose of 202 g over 90 days for a 70 kg adult, not far lower than the above LD_{50}.

According to the CLH report for boric acid published by the Bureau for Chemical Substances Lodz, Poland, boric acid in high doses shows significant developmental toxicity and teratogenicity in rabbit, rat, and mouse fetuses, as well as cardiovascular defects, skeletal variations, and mild kidney lesions. As a consequence in the 30th ATP to EU directive 67/548/EEC of August 2008, the European Commission decided to amend its classification as reprotoxic category 2 and to apply the risk phrases R60 (may impair fertility) and R61 (may cause harm to the unborn child).

At a 2010 European Diagnostics Manufacturing Association (EDMA) Meeting, several new additions to the substance of very high concern (SVHC) candidate list in relation to the Registration, Evaluation, Authorisation and Restriction of Chemicals Regulations 2007 (REACH) were discussed. Following the registration and review completed as part of REACH, the classification of boric acid CAS 10043-35-3 / 11113-50-1 is listed from 1 December 2010 is H360FD (May damage fertility. May damage the unborn child).

== Physics ==
Sound absorption in oceans not only depends on water molecules but also on dissolved salts present in low concentration in seawater. Boric acid and borate ([B] ≈ 4 × 10^{−4} M in seawater) relaxation contributes to absorbing sounds in the low‐frequency region (0.2–10 kHz). At higher frequencies, between 10 and 1000 kHz magnesium sulfate (formed by the second most abundant cation and anion species in seawater) is the main contributor to the absorption of acoustic waves in seawater.

== Uses ==
=== Industrial ===
The primary industrial use of boric acid is in the manufacture of monofilament fiberglass, which is usually referred to as textile fiberglass. Textile fiberglass is used to reinforce plastics in applications that range from boats to industrial piping to computer circuit boards.

In the jewelry industry, boric acid is often used in combination with denatured alcohol to reduce surface oxidation and formation of firescale on metals during annealing and soldering operations.

Boric acid is used in the production of glass in LCD flat panel displays.

In electroplating, boric acid is used as part of some proprietary formulas. One known formula uses about a 1 to 10 ratio of H_{3}BO_{3} to NiSO_{4}, a very small portion of sodium lauryl sulfate and a small portion of H_{2}SO_{4}.

The solution of orthoboric acid and borax in 4:5 ratio is used as a fire retarding agent of wood by impregnation. Also, it is used in combination with other chemicals for the fire retardancy of wood-based materials.

It is also used in the manufacturing of ramming mass, a fine silica-containing powder used for producing induction furnace linings and ceramics.

Boric acid is added to borax for use as welding flux by blacksmiths.

Boric acid, in combination with polyvinyl alcohol (PVA) or silicone oil, is used to manufacture Silly Putty.

Boric acid is also present in the list of chemical additives used for hydraulic fracturing (fracking) in the Marcellus Shale in Pennsylvania. It is often used in conjunction with guar gum as cross-linking and gelling agent for controlling the viscosity and the rheology of the fracking fluid injected at high pressure in the well. It is important to control the fluid viscosity for keeping in suspension on long transport distances the grains of the propping agents aimed at maintaining the cracks in the shales sufficiently open to facilitate the gas extraction after the hydraulic pressure is relieved. The rheological properties of borate cross-linked guar gum hydrogel mainly depend on the pH value.

Boric acid is used in some expulsion-type electrical fuses as a de-ionization/extinguishing agent. During an electrical fault in an expulsion-type fuse, a plasma arc is generated by the disintegration and rapid spring-loaded separation of the fusible element, which is typically a specialized metal rod that passes through a compressed mass of boric acid within the fuse assembly. The high-temperature plasma causes the boric acid to rapidly decompose into water vapor and boric anhydride, and in turn, the vaporization products de-ionize the plasma, helping to interrupt the electrical fault.

=== Medical ===
Boric acid can be used as an antiseptic for minor burns or cuts and is sometimes used in salves and dressings, such as boracic lint. Boric acid is applied in a very dilute solution as an eye wash. Boric acid vaginal suppositories can be used for recurrent candidiasis due to non-albicans candida as a second line treatment when conventional treatment has failed. It is less effective than conventional treatment overall. Boric acid largely spares lactobacilli within the vagina. As TOL-463, it is under development as an intravaginal medication for the treatment for vulvovaginal candidiasis.

As an antibacterial compound, boric acid can also be used as an acne treatment. It is also used to prevent athlete's foot, by inserting powder in the socks or stockings. Various preparations can be used to treat some kinds of otitis externa (ear infection) in both humans and animals. The preservative in urine sample bottles in the UK is boric acid.

Boric acid solutions used as an eye wash or on abraded skin are known to be toxic, particularly to infants, especially after repeated use; this is because of its slow elimination rate.

=== Insecticidal ===
Boric acid was first registered in the US as an insecticide in 1948 for control of cockroaches, termites, fire ants, fleas, silverfish, and many other insects. The product is generally considered safe in household kitchens to control cockroaches and ants. It acts as a stomach poison affecting the insects' metabolism. The dry powder is abrasive to the insects' exoskeletons. It is in non-specific IRAC group 8D.

Boric acid is also widely used in wood treatment to protect against termites. The full complexity of its mechanism is not fully understood. Still, aside from causing dose-dependent mortality, boric acid causes dysbiosis in the Eastern Subterranean termite, leading to the opportunistic rise of insect pathogens that could be contributing to mortality. In Japan the practice of laying newspapers treated with o-boric acid and borax under buildings has been effective in controlling Coptotermes formosanus and Reticulitermes speratus populations. Decaying wood treated with 0.25 to 0.5 percent disodium octaborate (Na_{2}B_{8}O_{13}·4H_{2}O, commonly abbreviated DOT) is also effective for baiting Heterotermes aureus populations. A 1997 paper concluded: "Borate baits would undoubtedly be helpful in the long-term, but do not appear sufficient as a sole method of structural protection."

=== Preservation ===
In combination with its use as an insecticide, boric acid also prevents and destroys existing wet and dry rot in timbers. It can be used in combination with an ethylene glycol carrier to treat external wood against fungal and insect attack. It is possible to buy borate-impregnated rods for insertion into wood via drill holes where dampness and moisture are known to collect and sit. It is available in a gel form and injectable paste form for treating rot-affected wood without replacing the timber. Concentrates of borate-based treatments can be used to prevent slime, mycelium, and algae growth, even in marine environments.

Boric acid is added to salt in the curing of cattle hides, calfskins, and sheepskins. This helps to control bacterial development and insects.

=== pH buffer ===
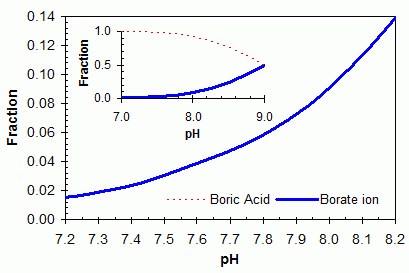
Boric acid predominates in solution below pH 9

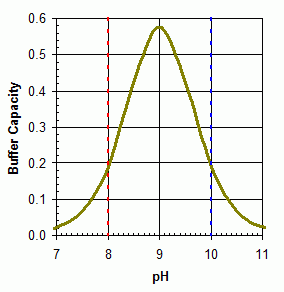
Boric acid buffers against rising pH in swimming pools

Boric acid in equilibrium with its conjugate base the borate ion is widely used (in the concentration range 50–100 ppm boron equivalents) as a primary or adjunct pH buffer system in swimming pools. Boric acid is a weak acid, with pK_{a} (the pH at which buffering is strongest because the free acid and borate ion are in equal concentrations) of 9.24 in pure water at 25 °C. But apparent pK_{a} is substantially lower in swimming pool or ocean waters because of interactions with various other molecules in solution. It will be around 9.0 in a saltwater pool. No matter which form of soluble boron is added, within the acceptable range of pH and boron concentration for swimming pools, boric acid is the predominant form in aqueous solution, as shown in the accompanying figure. The boric acid – borate system can be useful as a primary buffer system (substituting for the bicarbonate system with pK_{a_{1}} = 6.0 and pK_{a_{2}} = 9.4 under typical salt-water pool conditions) in pools with salt-water chlorine generators that tend to show upward drift in pH from a working range of pH 7.5–8.2. Buffer capacity is greater against rising pH (towards the pKa around 9.0), as illustrated in the accompanying graph. The use of boric acid in this concentration range does not allow any reduction in free HOCl concentration needed for pool sanitation. Still, it may add marginally to the photo-protective effects of cyanuric acid and confer other benefits through anti-corrosive activity or perceived water softness, depending on overall pool solute composition.

=== Lubrication ===
Colloidal suspensions of nanoparticles of boric acid dissolved in petroleum or vegetable oil can form a remarkable lubricant on ceramic or metal surfaces with a coefficient of sliding friction that decreases with increasing pressure to a value ranging from 0.10 to 0.02. Self-lubricating B(OH)_{3} films result from a spontaneous chemical reaction between water molecules and B_{2}O_{3} coatings in a humid environment. On a bulk scale, an inverse relationship exists between the friction coefficient and the Hertzian contact pressure induced by the applied load.

Boric acid is used to lubricate carrom and novuss boards, allowing for faster play.

=== Nuclear power ===
Boric acid is used in some nuclear power plants as a neutron poison. The boron in boric acid reduces the probability of thermal fission by absorbing some thermal neutrons. Fission chain reactions are generally driven by the probability that free neutrons will result in fission and is determined by the material and geometric properties of the reactor. Natural boron consists of approximately 20% boron-10 and 80% boron-11 isotopes. Boron-10 has a high cross-section for absorption of low-energy (thermal) neutrons. By increasing boric acid concentration in the reactor coolant, the probability that a neutron will cause fission is reduced. Changes in boric acid concentration can effectively regulate the rate of fission taking place in the reactor. During normal at power operation, boric acid is used only in pressurized water reactors (PWRs), whereas boiling water reactors (BWRs) employ control rod pattern and coolant flow for power control. However, BWRs can use an aqueous solution of boric acid and borax or sodium pentaborate for an emergency shutdown system if the control rods fail to insert. Boric acid may be dissolved in spent fuel pools used to store spent fuel elements. The concentration is high enough to keep neutron multiplication at a minimum. Boric acid was dumped over Reactor 4 of the Chernobyl nuclear power plant after its meltdown to prevent another reaction from occurring.

=== Pyrotechnics ===
Boron is used in pyrotechnics to prevent the amide-forming reaction between aluminium and nitrates. A small amount of boric acid is added to the composition to neutralize alkaline amides that can react with the aluminium.

Boric acid can be used as a colorant to make fire green. For example, when dissolved in methanol, it is popularly used by fire jugglers and fire spinners to create a deep green flame much stronger than copper sulfate.

=== Agriculture ===
Boric acid is used to treat or prevent boron deficiencies in plants. It is also used in the preservation of grains such as rice and wheat.
