= Gas stove =

Type of cooking stove

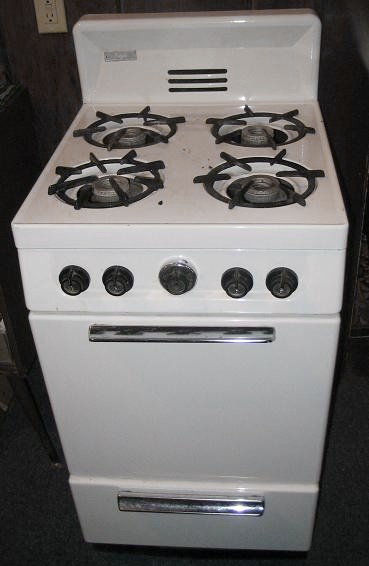
Many stoves use natural gas as a heat source.

A gas stove is a stove that is fuelled by flammable gas such as natural gas, propane, butane, liquefied petroleum gas or syngas. Before the advent of gas, cooking stoves relied on solid fuels, such as coal or wood. The first gas stoves were developed in the 1820s and a gas stove factory was established in England in 1836. This new cooking technology had the advantage of being easily adjustable and could be turned off when not in use. The gas stove, however, did not become a commercial success until the 1880s, by which time supplies of piped gas were available in cities and large towns in Britain. The stoves became widespread in Continental Europe and in the United States in the early 20th century.

Gas stoves became more common when the oven was integrated into the base and resized to fit in with the rest of the kitchen furniture. By the 1910s, producers started to enamel their gas stoves for easier cleaning. Early models used match ignition, later replaced by pilot lights — more convenient but wasteful due to constant gas use. Ovens still required manual ignition, posing explosion risks if the gas was accidentally turned on, but not ignited. To prevent this, safety valves known as flame failure devices were introduced for gas hobs (cooktops) and ovens. Modern gas stoves typically feature electronic ignition and oven timers.

Gas stoves are an indoor common fossil-fuel appliance that contributes to significant levels of indoor air pollution, but good ventilation reduces the health risk. They also expose users to pollutants, such as nitrogen dioxide, which can trigger respiratory diseases, and have shown an increase in the rates of asthma in children. In 2023, Stanford researchers found combustion from gas stoves can raise indoor levels of benzene, a potent carcinogen linked to a higher risk of blood cell cancers, to more than that found in secondhand tobacco smoke. The health harms of gas stoves have prompted efforts to phase them out and use alternatives, such as induction stoves.

Gas stoves also release methane. Research in 2022 estimated that the methane emissions from gas stoves in the United States were equivalent to the greenhouse gas emissions of 500,000 cars. About 80% of methane emissions were found to occur even when stoves are turned off, as the result of tiny leaks in gas lines and fittings. Although methane contains less carbon than other fuels, gas venting and unintended fugitive emissions throughout the supply chain results in natural gas having a similar carbon footprint to other fossil fuels overall.

== History ==
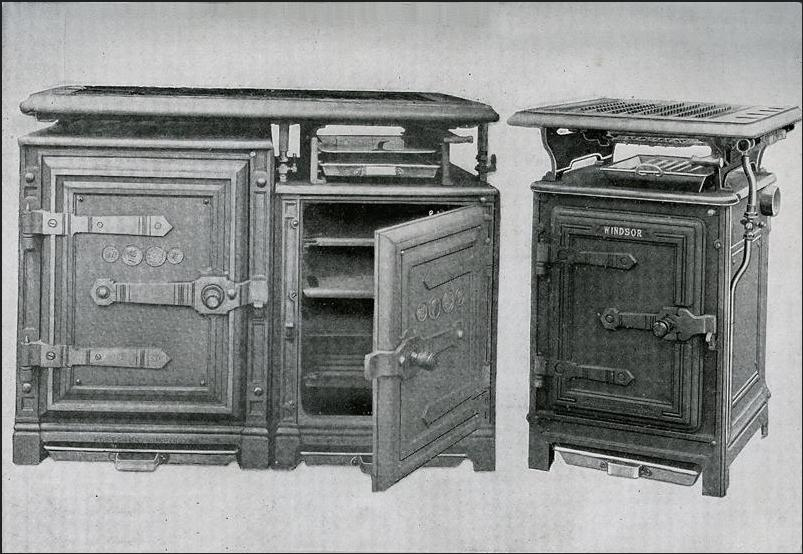
Early gas stoves produced by Windsor. From Mrs Beeton's Book of Household Management, 1904.

The first gas stove was developed in 1802 by Zachäus Winzler (de), but this along with other attempts remained isolated experiments. James Sharp patented a gas stove in Northampton, England in 1826 and opened a gas stove factory in 1836. His invention was marketed by the firm Smith & Philips from 1828. An important figure in the early acceptance of this new technology, was Alexis Soyer, the renowned chef at the Reform Club in London. From 1841, he converted his kitchen to consume piped gas, arguing that gas was cheaper overall because the supply could be turned off when the stove was not in use.

A gas stove was shown at the Great Exhibition in London in 1851, but it was only in the 1880s that the technology became a commercial success in England. By that stage a large and reliable network for gas pipeline transport had spread over much of the country, making gas relatively cheap and efficient for domestic use. Gas stoves only became widespread on the European Continent and in the United States in the early 20th century.

By the early 1920s, gas stoves with enameled porcelain finishes for easier cleaning had become widely available, along with heavy use of insulation for fuel-efficiency.

The gas industry has launched multiple advertising campaigns since the early 20th century to increase the adaptation and uptake of gas stoves in America. The popular slogan "cooking with gas" was first adopted in 1930s to suggest the superiority of gas stoves and remain in use today despite the rapid improvement in electric stove technology. The term natural gas was also a marketing strategy to suggest this fuel is cleaner and superior to other fossil fuels. In the 1960s the American Gas Association ran a $1.3 million dollar advertising campaign called "Operation Attack" to promote gas stoves while also downplaying science showing their health risks, mirroring the tobacco industry playbook of creating uncertainty. LPG gas has replaced kerosene stoves in many countries to improve indoor air quality. LPG gas stoves, according to some studies, have been linked to childhood asthma and there have been rumours of bans on gas cooking.

== Ignition ==
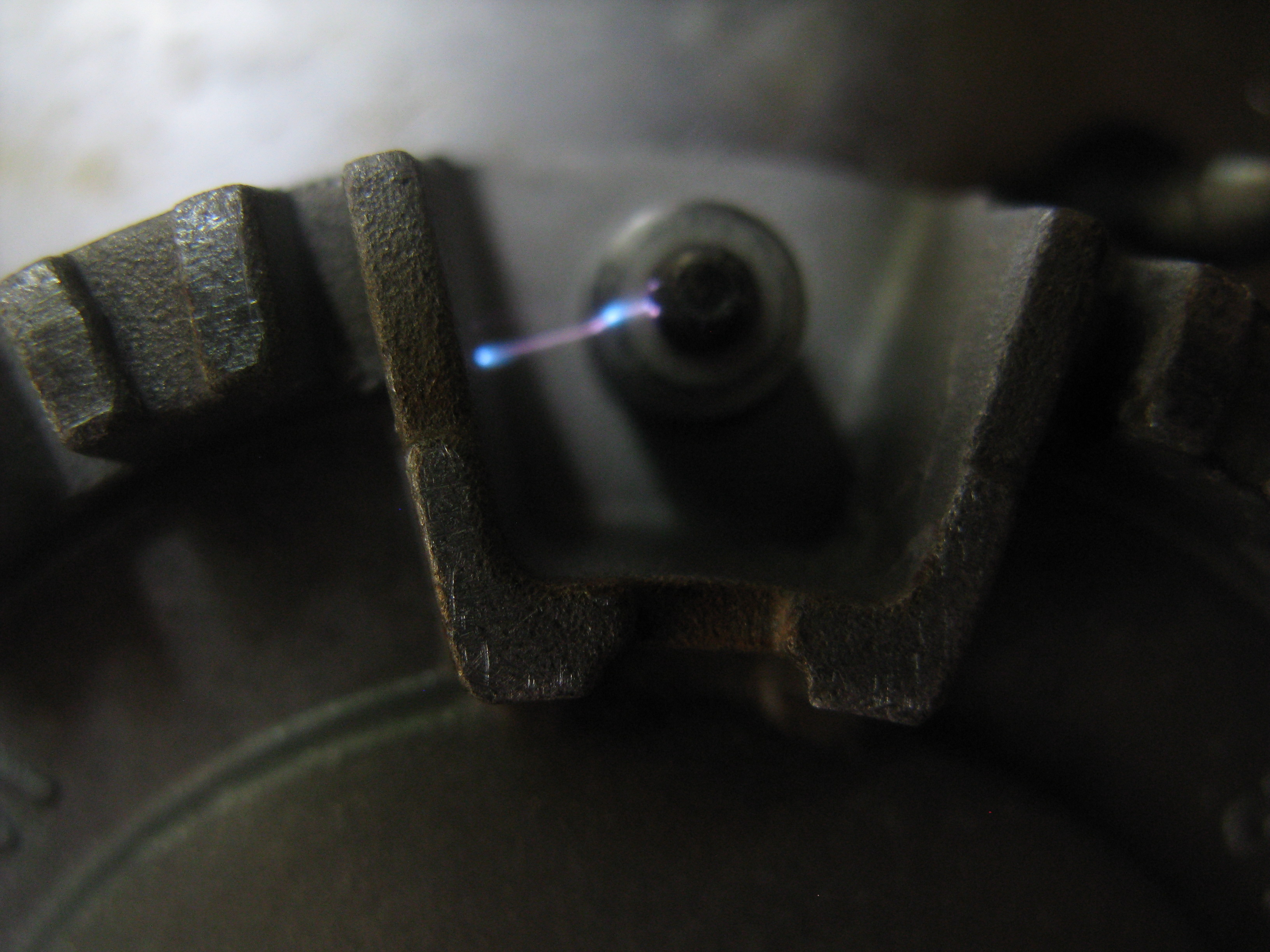
Electric ignition spark

Gas stoves today use two basic types of ignition sources, standing pilot and electric. A stove with a standing pilot has a small, continuously burning gas flame (called a pilot light) under the cooktop. The flame is between the front and back burners. When the stove is turned on, this flame lights the gas flowing out of the burners. The advantage of the standing pilot system is that it is simple and completely independent of any outside power source. A minor drawback is that the flames continuously consume fuel even when the stove is not in use. Early gas ovens did not have a pilot. One had to light these manually with a match. If one accidentally left the gas on, gas would fill the oven and eventually the room. A small spark, such as an arc from a light switch being turned on, could ignite the gas, triggering a violent explosion. To prevent these types of accidents, oven manufacturers developed and installed a safety valve called a flame failure device for gas hobs (cooktops) and ovens. The safety valve depends on a thermocouple that sends a signal to the valve to stay open. Although most modern gas stoves have electronic ignition, many households have gas cooking ranges and ovens that need to be lit with a flame. Electric ignition stoves use electric sparks to ignite the surface burners. This is the "clicking sound" audible just before the burner actually lights. The sparks are initiated by turning the gas burner knob to a position typically labeled "LITE" or by pressing the 'ignition' button. Once the burner lights, the knob is turned further to modulate the flame size. Auto reignition is an elegant refinement: the user need not know or understand the wait-then-turn sequence. They simply turn the burner knob to the desired flame size and the sparking is turned off automatically when the flame lights. Auto reignition also provides a safety feature: the flame will be automatically reignited if the flame goes out while the gas is still on—for example by a gust of wind. If the power fails, surface burners must be manually match-lit.

Electric ignition for ovens uses a "hot surface" or "glow bar" ignitor. Basically it is a heating element that heats up to gas's ignition temperature. A sensor detects when the glow bar is hot enough and opens the gas valve.

== Features ==
=== Burner heat ===
One of the important properties of a gas stove is the heat emitted by the burners. Burner heat is typically specified in terms of kilowatts or British Thermal Units per hour and is directly based on the gas consumption rather than heat absorbed by pans.

Often, a gas stove will have burners with different heat output ratings. For example, a gas cooktop may have a high output burner, often in the range 3 to 6 kilowatts (10,000 to 20,000 BTU/h), and a mixture of medium output burners, 1.5 to 3 kW, and low output burners, 1 kW or less. The high output burner is suitable for boiling a large pot of water quickly, sautéing and searing, while the low output burners are good for simmering. Mean benzene emissions from gas and propane burners on high and ovens set to 350 °F ranged from 2.8 to 6.5 μg min–1, 10 to 25 times higher than emissions from electric coil and radiant alternatives.

Some high-end cooktop models provide higher range of heat and heavy-duty burners that can go up to 6 kilowatts (20,000 BTU/h) or even more. These may be desired for preparing large quantities or special types of food and enable certain advanced cooking techniques. However, these burners produce greater emissions and necessitate better ventilation for safe operation. Higher capacity burners may not benefit every potential user or dish.

=== Design and layout ===
In the last few years, appliance manufacturers have been making innovative changes to the design and layout of gas stoves. Most of the modern cooktops have come with lattice structure which usually covers the complete range of the top, enabling sliding of cookware from one burner to another without lifting the containers over the gaps of cooktop. Some modern gas stoves also have central fifth burner or an integrated griddle in between the outer burners.

=== Size ===
The size of a kitchen gas stove usually ranges from 50 to 150 centimetres (20 to 60 in). Almost all the manufacturers have been developing several range of options in size range. Combination of range and oven are also available which usually come in two styles: slide in and freestanding.

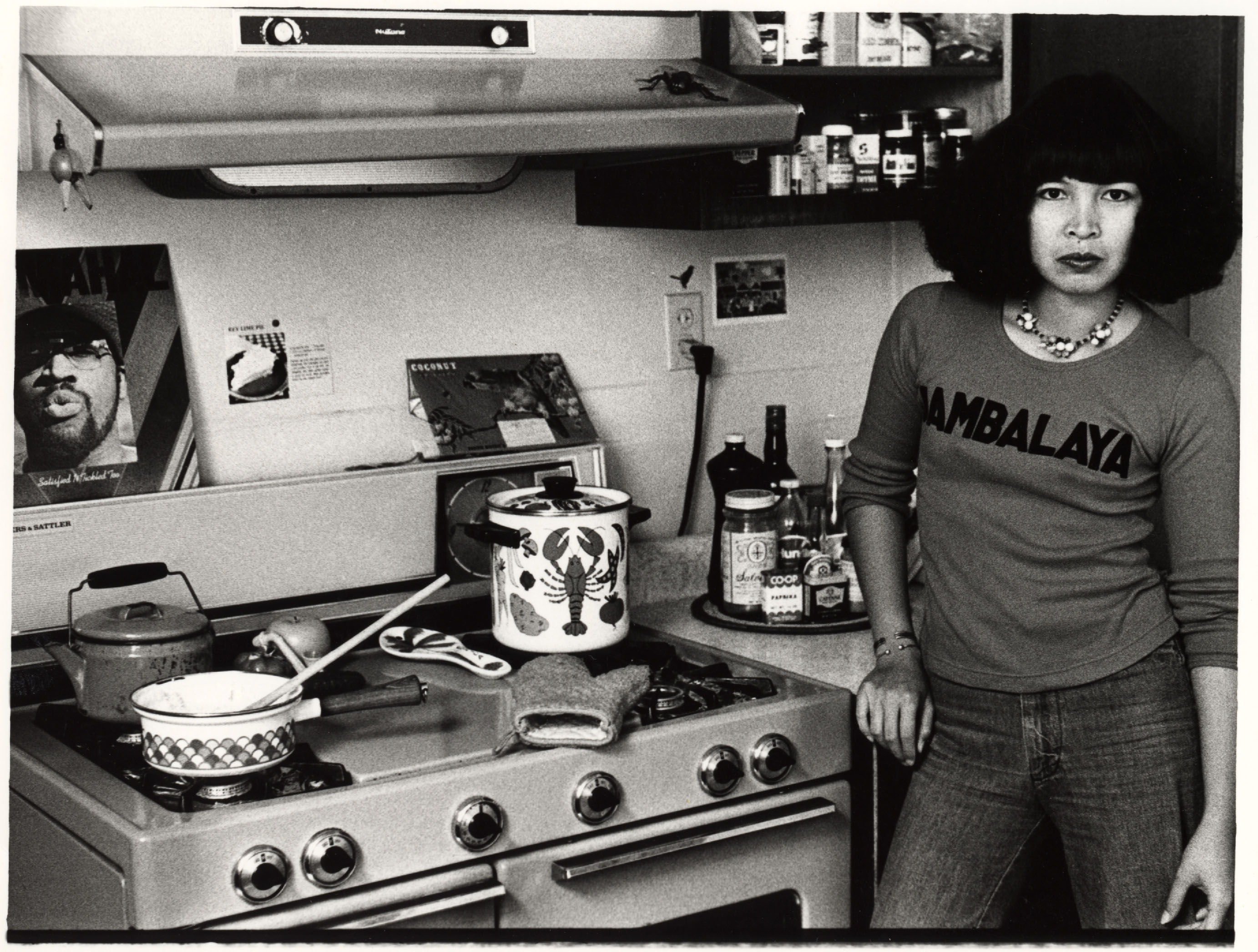
A gas stove in a San Francisco apartment, 1975.

Usually, there is not much of a style difference in between them. Slide-in come with lips on either side and controls over the front along with burner controls. Freestanding gas range cooktops have solid slides and controls placed behind the cooktop.

=== Oven ===
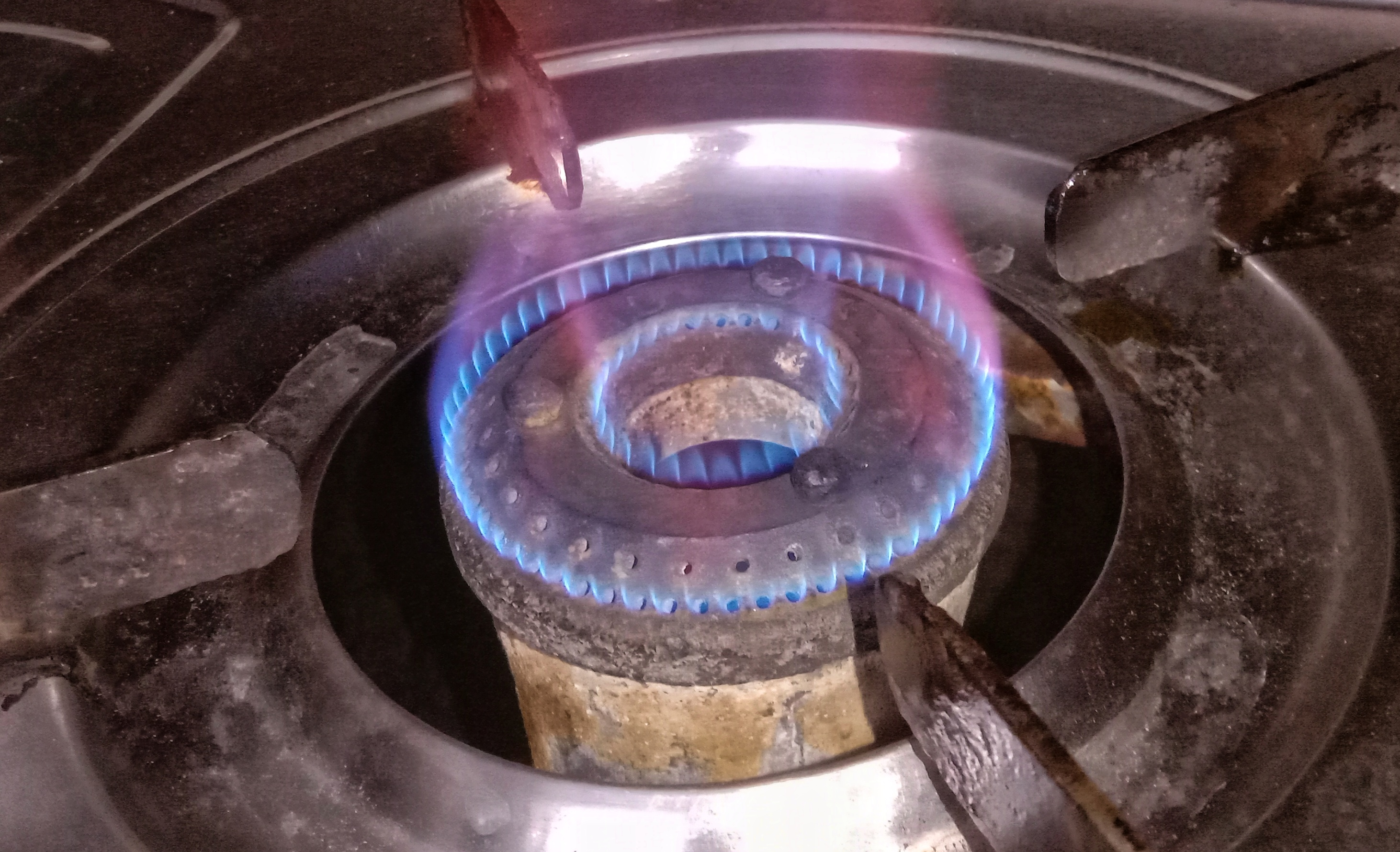
Flames in a gas oven burn with a blue flame colour, meaning complete combustion, as with other gas appliances.

Many stoves have integrated ovens. Modern ovens often include a convection fan inside the oven to provide even air circulation and let the food cook evenly. Some modern ovens come with temperature sensors which allows close control of baking, automatically shut off after reaching certain temperature, or hold on to particular temperature through the cooking process. Ovens may also have two separate oven bays which allows cooking of two different dishes at the same time.

=== Programmable controls ===
Many gas stoves come with at least few modern programmable controls to make the handling easier. LCD displays and some other complex cooking routines are some of the standard features present in most of the basic and high-end manufacturing models. Some of the other programmable controls include precise pre-heating, automatic pizza, cook timers and others.

=== Safety factors ===
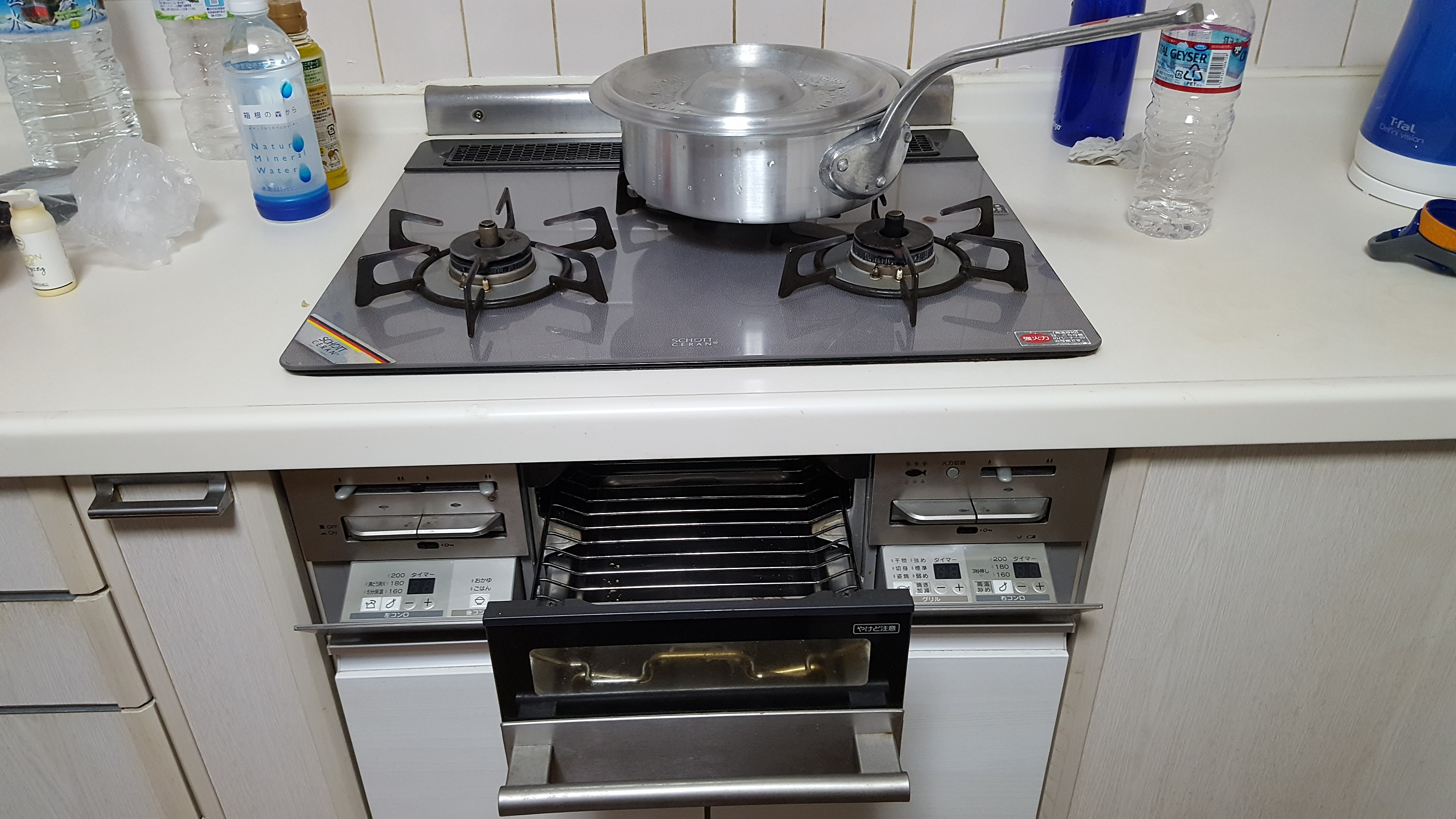
A built-in Japanese three burner gas stove with a fish grill. Note the thermistor buttons protruding from the gas burners, which cut off the flame if the temperature exceeds 250 °C.

Modern gas stove ranges are safer than older models. Two of the major safety concerns with gas stoves are child-safe controls and accidental ignition. Some gas cooktops have knobs which can be accidentally switched on even with a gentle bump.

Gas stoves are at risk of overheating when frying oil, raising the oil temperature to the auto-ignition point and creating an oil fire on the stove. Japan, South Korea and China have regulated the addition of electronic safety devices to prevent pan overheating. The devices use a thermistor to monitor the temperature close to the pan, and cut off the gas supply if the heat is too high.

=== Efficiency ===
The U.S. Department of Energy (DOE) ran tests in 2014 of cooktop energy transfer efficiency, simulating cooking while testing what percentage of a cooktop's energy is transferred to a test block. Gas had an efficiency of 44%, lower than the 70% reached by induction cooking and electric coil cooktops. This level of efficiency is only possible if the pan is big enough for the burner.

Japanese gas flames are angled upwards towards the pot to increase efficiency. The efficiency of gas appliances can be raised by using special pots with heatsink-like fins. Jetboil manufactures pots for portable stoves that use a corrugated ribbon to increase efficiency.

== Health impact ==
Carbon monoxide, formaldehyde, benzene and nitrogen dioxide from gas stoves contribute to indoor air pollution, causing around 60 thousand early deaths each year (40 thousand in Europe and 19 thousand in the United States). Nitrogen dioxide can exacerbate respiratory illnesses, such as asthma or chronic obstructive pulmonary disease. Studies have been performed correlating childhood asthma and gas stoves. A 1999–2004 study published in The Lancet Respiratory Medicine found "no evidence of an association between the use of gas as a cooking fuel and either asthma symptoms or asthma diagnosis". A 2013 meta-analysis concluded that gas cooking increases the risk of asthma in children. A 2020 Lancet systematic review surveyed 31 studies on gas cooking or heating, finding a pooled risk ratio of 1.17 for asthma. One study found that in households with gas stoves those that report using ventilation had lower rates of asthma than those that did not. A 2023 meta-analysis estimated that in the United States, one in eight cases of asthma in children are due to pollution from gas stoves. The asthma risk caused by gas stove exposure is similar in magnitude to that caused by secondhand smoke from tobacco. Stoves can cause levels of nitrogen dioxide that can exceed outdoor safety standards. A 2020 RMI report found pollution from gas stoves causes exacerbation of asthma symptoms in children.

People interact more directly with their stove than with other gas appliances, increasing potential exposure to any natural gas constituents and compounds formed during combustion, including formaldehyde (CH_{2}O) carbon monoxide (CO), and nitrogen oxides (NOx). Among all gas appliances, the stove is unique in that the byproducts of combustion are emitted directly into home air with no requirement for venting the exhaust outdoors. Cooking, especially high heat frying, releases smoke (measured as fine particulate matter), acrolein and polycyclic aromatic hydrocarbons. Mitigating indoor particulate pollution can involve running a range hood, opening a kitchen window, and running an air purifier. Range hoods are more effective at capturing and removing pollution on the rear burners than the front burners. California requires gas stoves to have higher levels of ventilation than electric stoves due to the nitrogen dioxide risk. Range hoods can be run for 15 minutes after cooking to reduce pollution. The U.S. Consumer Product Safety Commission is investigating reducing the health effects of gas stoves, including emissions and ventilation standards.

A 2023 study found benzene, a known carcinogen, accumulated in homes to unhealthy levels when natural gas or propane stoves were used, especially when vent hoods were not used. The Stanford researchers determined benzene is emitted from the cooking gas, not the food being cooked. Benzene exposure causes both cancer and noncancerous health effects. Shorter-term benzene exposure suppresses blood cell production, and chronic benzene exposure increases the risk of leukemias and lymphomas. A 2002 study of pipelines in Boston found that natural gas contains non-methane impurities including heptane, hexane, cyclohexane, benzene and toluene.

After health concerns about gas stoves became more prominent in the 2020s and American localities regulated additions of gas stoves to new buildings, the Republican Party in the United States pushed legislative bills to "save gas stoves". In June 2023, a bill in the Republican-controlled House of Representatives narrowly failed as a dozen Republican legislators voted against the bill due to a disagreement with the Republican leadership on unrelated issues.

== Climate impact ==
Gas stoves are often run on natural gas. The extraction and consumption of natural gas is a major and growing contributor to climate change. Both the gas itself (specifically methane) and carbon dioxide, which is released when natural gas is burned, are greenhouse gases. In 2022, a research group investigated leakage in 53 homes in California and estimated the methane emissions from gas stoves in the United States were equivalent over a 20-year period to the greenhouse gas emissions of 500,000 cars. About 80% of methane emissions occur when stoves are turned off, as the result of leaks in gas lines and fittings.

== Phase-out ==
Some places, such as the Australian Capital Territory and New York State, have curtailed installation of gas stoves and appliances in new construction, for reasons of health, indoor air quality, and climate protection. The natural gas industry in the United States have spent millions of dollars resisting attempts to impose more regulations or bans on gas stoves in residential buildings. As of 2023, the legality of gas stove bans in the United States is the subject of active lawsuits. The European Union and some Canadian cities may ban gas stoves in new buildings.

Many electrification codes exempt commercial kitchens.

== See also ==
- Auto reignition
- Electric stove
- List of stoves
