= Electric spark =

Abrupt electrical discharge through an ionised channel

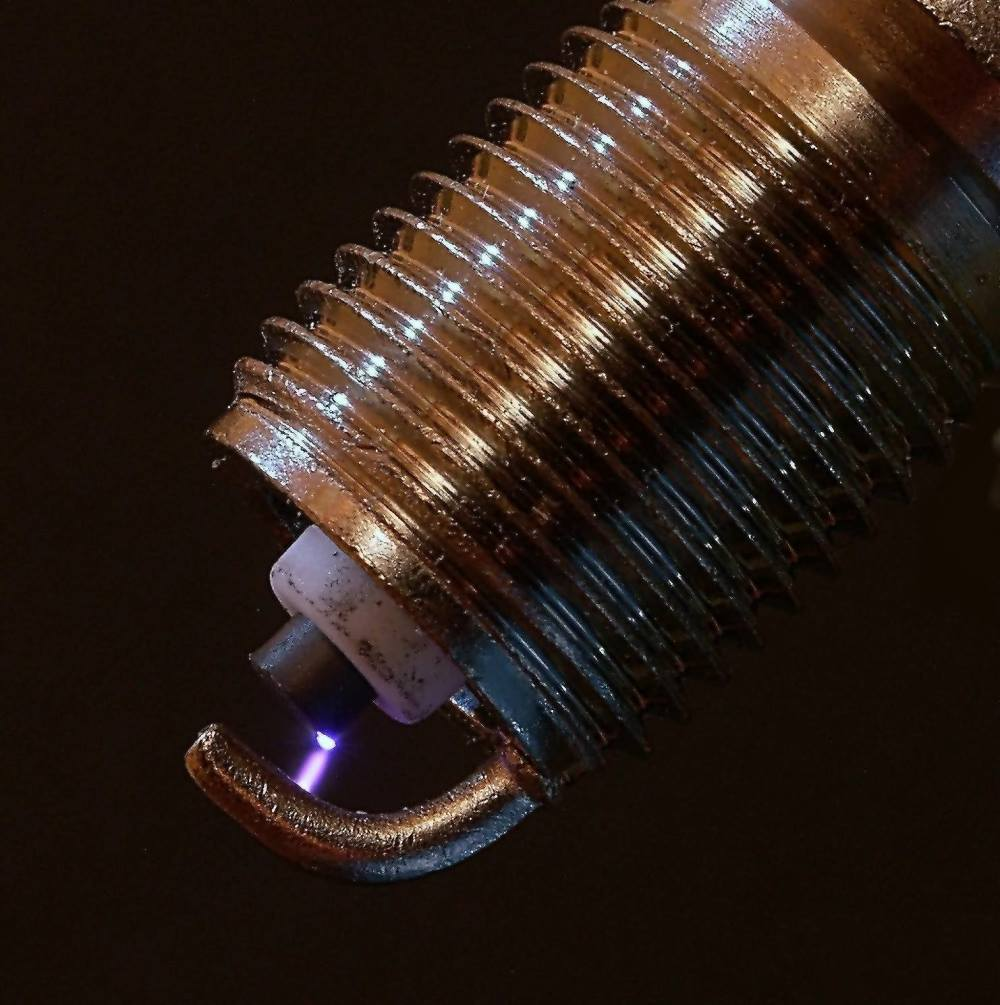
A spark on a spark plug

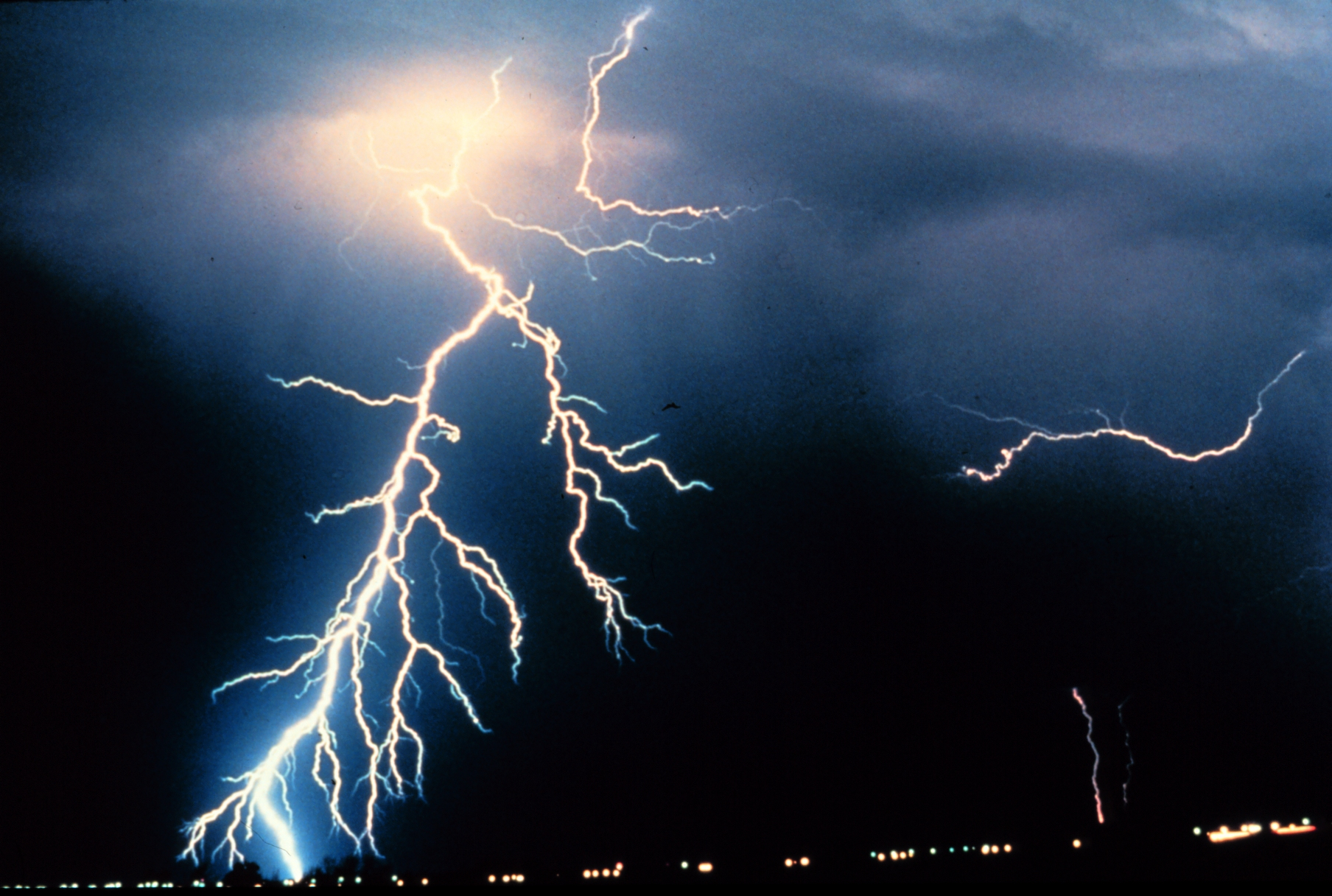
Lightning is a natural example of an electric spark.

An electric spark is an abrupt electrical discharge that occurs when a sufficiently high electric field creates an ionized, electrically conductive channel through a normally-insulating medium, often air or other gases or gas mixtures. Michael Faraday described this phenomenon as "the beautiful flash of light attending the discharge of common electricity".

The rapid transition from a non-conducting to a conductive state produces a brief emission of light and a sharp crack or snapping sound. A spark is created when the applied electric field exceeds the dielectric breakdown strength of the intervening medium. For air, the breakdown strength is about 30 kV/cm at sea level. Experimentally, this figure tends to differ depending upon humidity, atmospheric pressure, shape of electrodes (needle and ground-plane, hemispherical etc.) and the corresponding spacing between them and even the type of waveform, whether sinusoidal or cosine-rectangular.

At the beginning stages, free electrons in the gap (from cosmic rays or background radiation) are accelerated by the electrical field, resulting in a Townsend avalanche. As they collide with air molecules, they create additional ions and newly freed electrons which are also accelerated. At some point, thermal energy will provide a much greater source of ions. The exponentially-increasing electrons and ions rapidly cause regions of the air in the gap to become electrically conductive in a process called dielectric breakdown. Once the gap breaks down, current flow is limited by the available charge (for an electrostatic discharge) or by the impedance of the external power supply. If the power supply continues to supply current, the spark will evolve into a continuous discharge called an electric arc. An electric spark can also occur within insulating liquids or solids, but with different breakdown mechanisms from sparks in gases.

Sometimes, sparks can be dangerous. They can cause fires and burn skin.

Lightning is an example of an electric spark in nature, while electric sparks, large or small, occur in or near many man-made objects, either by design or by accident.

== History ==
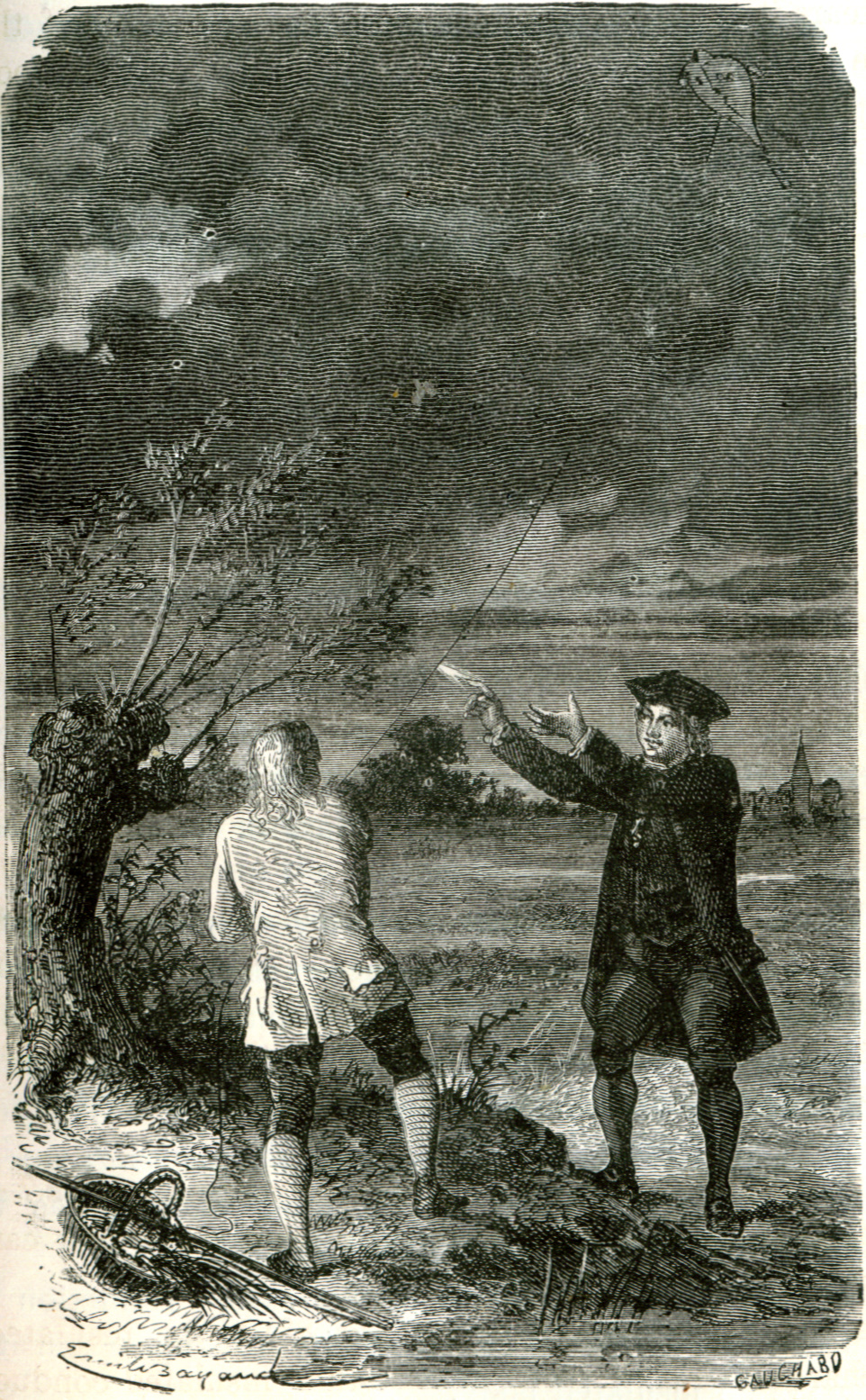
Benjamin Franklin drawing an electric spark to his finger from a key suspended from a kite string.

In 1671, Leibniz discovered that sparks were associated with electrical phenomena. In 1708, Samuel Wall performed experiments with amber rubbed with cloth to produce sparks. In 1752, Thomas-François Dalibard, acting on an experiment proposed by Benjamin Franklin, arranged for a retired French dragoon named Coiffier in the village of Marly to collect lightning in a Leyden jar thereby proving that lightning and electricity are the same. In Franklin's famous kite experiment, he successfully extracted sparks from a cloud during a thunderstorm.

== Uses ==
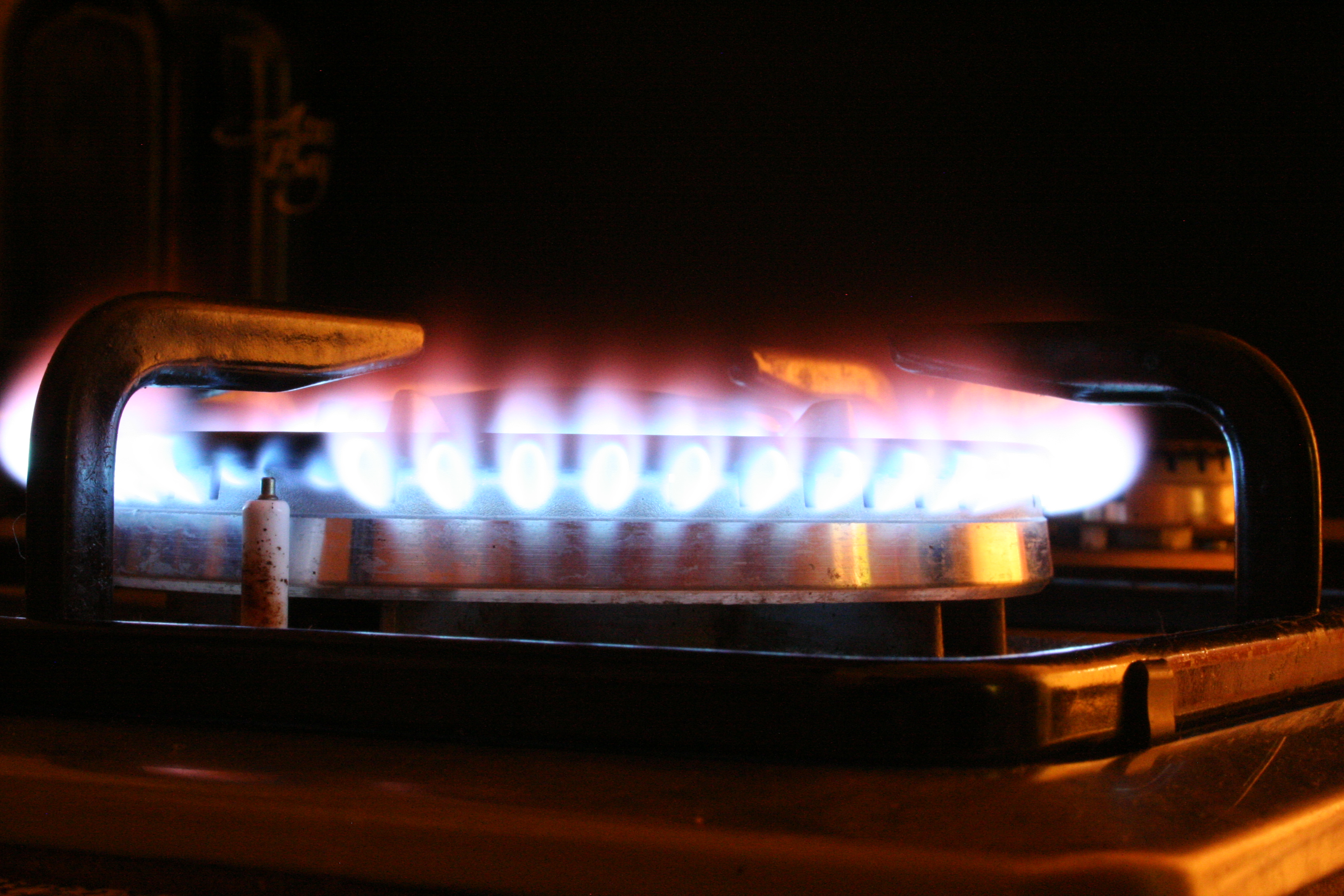
Gas stove burner - the electric spark flame igniter is shown at the left.

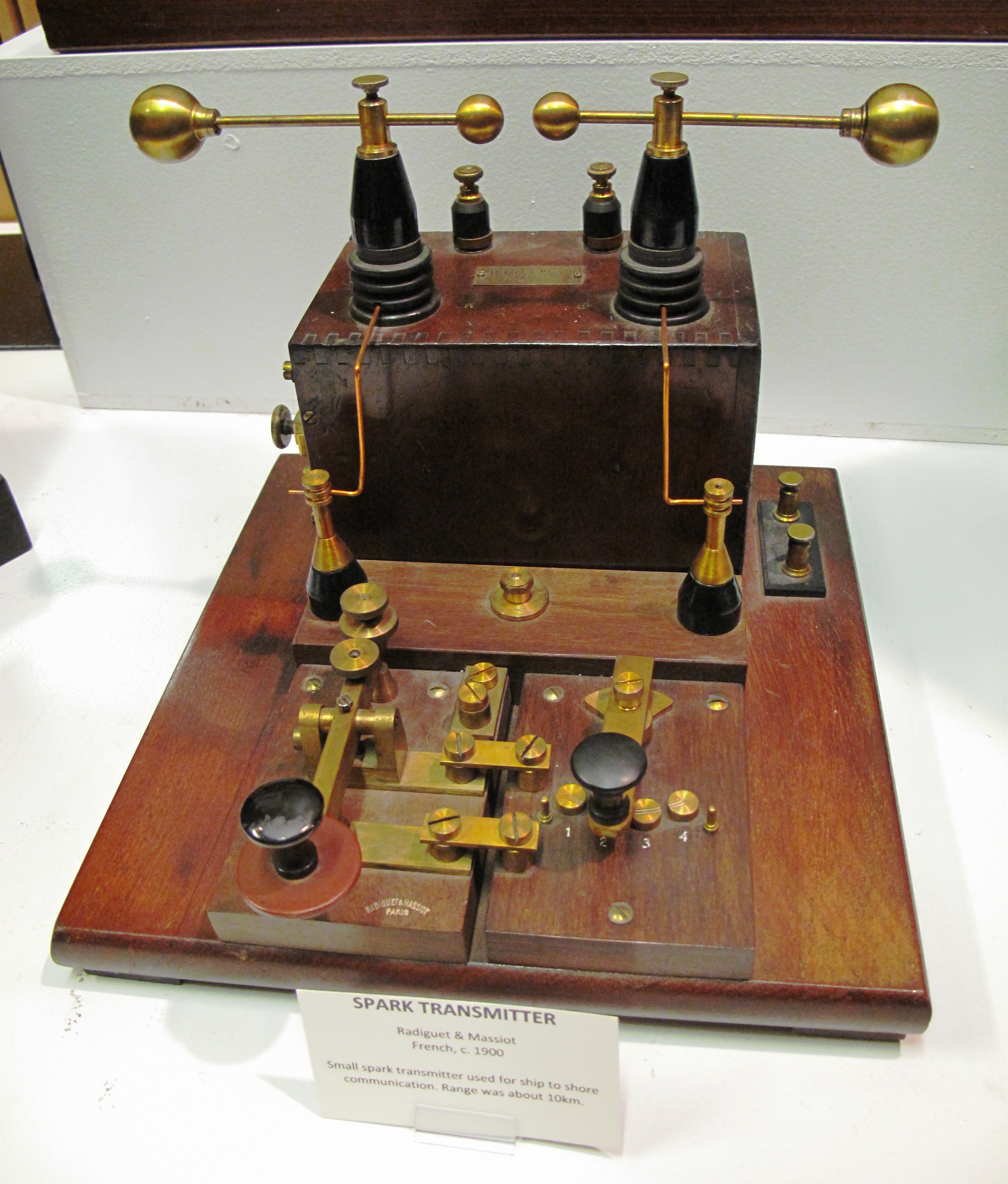
Spark transmitter used for ship to shore communication up to 10 km (c. 1900)."

=== Ignition sources ===
Electric sparks are used in spark plugs in gasoline internal combustion engines to ignite fuel and air mixtures. The electric discharge in a spark plug occurs between an insulated central electrode and a grounded terminal on the base of the plug. The voltage for the spark is provided by an ignition coil or magneto that is connected to the spark plug with an insulated wire.

Flame igniters use electric sparks to initiate combustion in some furnaces and gas stoves in place of a pilot flame. Auto reignition is a safety feature that is used in some flame igniters that senses the electrical conductivity of the flame and uses this information to determine whether a burner flame is lit. This information is used to stop an ignition device from sparking after the flame is lit or restart the flame if it goes out.

=== Radio communications ===
A spark-gap transmitter uses an electric spark gap to generate radio frequency electromagnetic radiation that can be used as transmitters for Wireless communication. Spark gap transmitters were widely used in the first three decades of radio from 1887–1916. They were later supplanted by vacuum tube systems and by 1940 were no longer used for communication. The wide use of spark-gap transmitters led to the nickname "sparks" for a ship's radio officer.

=== Metalworking ===
Electric sparks are used in different kinds of metalworking. Electric discharge machining (EDM) is sometimes called spark machining and uses a spark discharge to remove material from a workpiece. Electrical discharge machining is used for hard metals or those that are difficult to machine with traditional techniques.

Spark plasma sintering (SPS) is a sintering technique that uses a pulsed direct current that passes through a conductive powder in a graphite die. SPS is faster than conventional hot isostatic pressing, where the heat is provided by external heating elements.

=== Chemical analysis ===
The light that is produced by electric sparks can be collected and used for a type of spectroscopy called spark emission spectroscopy.

A high energy pulsed laser can be used to produce an electric spark. Laser induced breakdown spectroscopy (LIBS) is a type of atomic emission spectroscopy that uses a high pulse energy laser to excite atoms in a sample. LIBS has also been called laser spark spectroscopy (LSS).

Electric sparks can also be used to create ions for mass spectrometry. Spark discharge has been also applied in electrochemical sensing via the in-situ surface modification of disposable screen printed carbon electrodes (SPEs) with various metal and carbon sources.

== Hazards ==
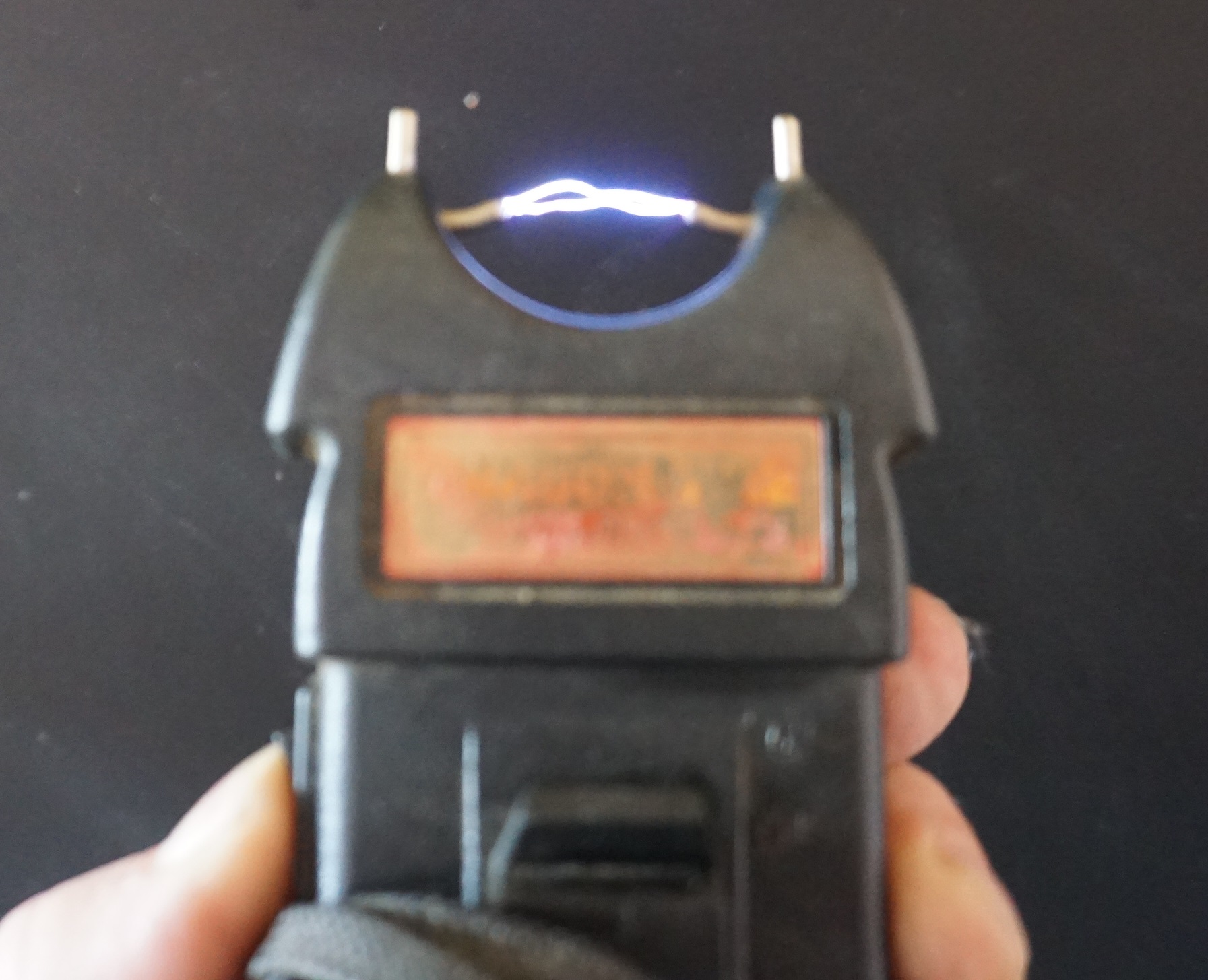
An electric spark produced by a stun gun. At 150,000 volts, the spark can easily jump a gap greater than 25 mm (1 in).

Sparks can be hazardous to people, animals or even inanimate objects. Electric sparks can ignite flammable materials, liquids, gases and vapors. Even inadvertent static discharges or small sparks that occur when switching on lights or other circuits can be enough to ignite flammable vapors from sources like gasoline, acetone, propane, or dust concentrations in the air, such as those found in flour mills or more generally in factories handling powders.

Sparks often indicate the presence of a high voltage, or "potential field". The higher the voltage; the farther a spark can jump across a gap, and with enough energy supplied can lead to greater discharges such as a glow or an arc. When a person is charged with high-voltage static-charges, or is in the presence of high-voltage electrical supplies, a spark can jump between a conductor and a person, allowing the release of much higher energies that can cause severe burns, shut down the heart and internal organs, or even develop into an arc flash.

High-voltage sparks, even those with low energy such as from a stun gun, can overload the conductive pathways of the nervous system, causing involuntary muscle-contractions, or interfere with vital nervous-system functions such as heart rhythm. When the energy is low enough most of it may be used just heating the air, so the spark never fully stabilizes into a glow or arc. However, sparks with very low energy still produce a "plasma tunnel" through the air, through which electricity can pass. This plasma is heated to temperatures often greater than the surface of the Sun, and can cause small, localized burns. Conductive liquids, gels or ointments are often used when applying electrodes to a person's body, preventing sparks from forming at the point of contact and damaging skin. Similarly, sparks can cause damage to metals and other conductors, ablating or pitting the surface; a phenomenon which is exploited in electric etching. Sparks also produce ozone which, in high enough concentrations, can cause respiratory discomfort or distress, itching, or tissue damage, and can be harmful to other materials such as certain plastics.

== See also ==
- Corona discharge
- Electrical breakdown
- Paschen's law
- Static electricity
