= Flame supervision device =

Device to detect the failure of a gas flame

For gas appliances, a flame supervision device (FSD) – alternative name: flame failure device (FFD) – is a general term for any device designed to stop flammable gas going to the burner of a gas appliance if the flame is extinguished. This is to prevent a dangerous buildup of gas within the appliance, its chimney or the room. Causes of flame failure include chimney downdraught, temporary interruption of the gas supply, gas under-pressure, liquid overspill on cooker hotplates or the draught from an oven door being opened and closed.

FSDs may utilize one of several technologies: thermoelectric valves, flame conductance, flame rectification, ultraviolet sensing devices and liquid expansion valves.

FSD usage in consumer products differs among political units – in the U.S., FSDs are not required by law or regulation for gas range (or gas stove) top burners and consequently are not present on ranges in the U.S. Cooker hotplates may not have a FSD on each burner. If a hotplate is to be used in a multi-occupancy building every burner must have its own FSD.

When the FSD activates it should stop (or reduce to safe levels) gas flow to the burner until it is reset manually.

Older devices, such as bimetallic strips, were used in conjunction with pilot lights. The pilot light is no longer used in new devices, but may still be encountered on old appliances still in service. Pilot lights were withdrawn because their continual small flame represented a waste of fuel. Pilot lights required their own FSD, typically a thermocouple which held the valve open. Regular testing of FSD is a part of routine maintenance for gas appliances.

Other safety devices may be fitted in addition to an FSD. One type of these are the Vitiation Sensing Devices, that detect an adequate supply of oxygen for efficient combustion, thus avoiding the production of poisonous carbon monoxide. As well as detecting a blocked supply of oxygen, these must also detect a blocked exhaust or reversed flow in the exhaust flue owing to wind conditions. Two methods are used to provide these, an Oxygen Depletion System (ODS) that measures the availability of oxygen for combustion or an Atmospheric Sensing Device (ASD) measures excess heat rise in the exhaust.

== See also ==
- Flame detector
