= Thermal imaging camera =

Thermal imaging camera in firefighting

A thermal imaging camera (colloquially known as a TIC) is a type of thermographic camera used in firefighting. By rendering infrared radiation as visible light, such cameras allow firefighters to see areas of heat through smoke, darkness, or heat-permeable barriers. Thermal imaging cameras are typically handheld, but may be integrated with other pieces of equipment such as helmets and SCBAs. They are constructed using heat- and water-resistant housings, and ruggedized to withstand the hazards of fireground operations, often meeting the requirements of NFPA 1801, Standard on Thermal Imagers for the Fire Service.

While they are expensive pieces of equipment, their popularity and adoption by firefighters in the United States is increasing markedly due to the increased availability of government equipment grants following the September 11 attacks in 2001. Thermal imaging cameras pick up body heat, and they are normally used in cases where people are trapped where rescuers cannot find them.

== Construction ==
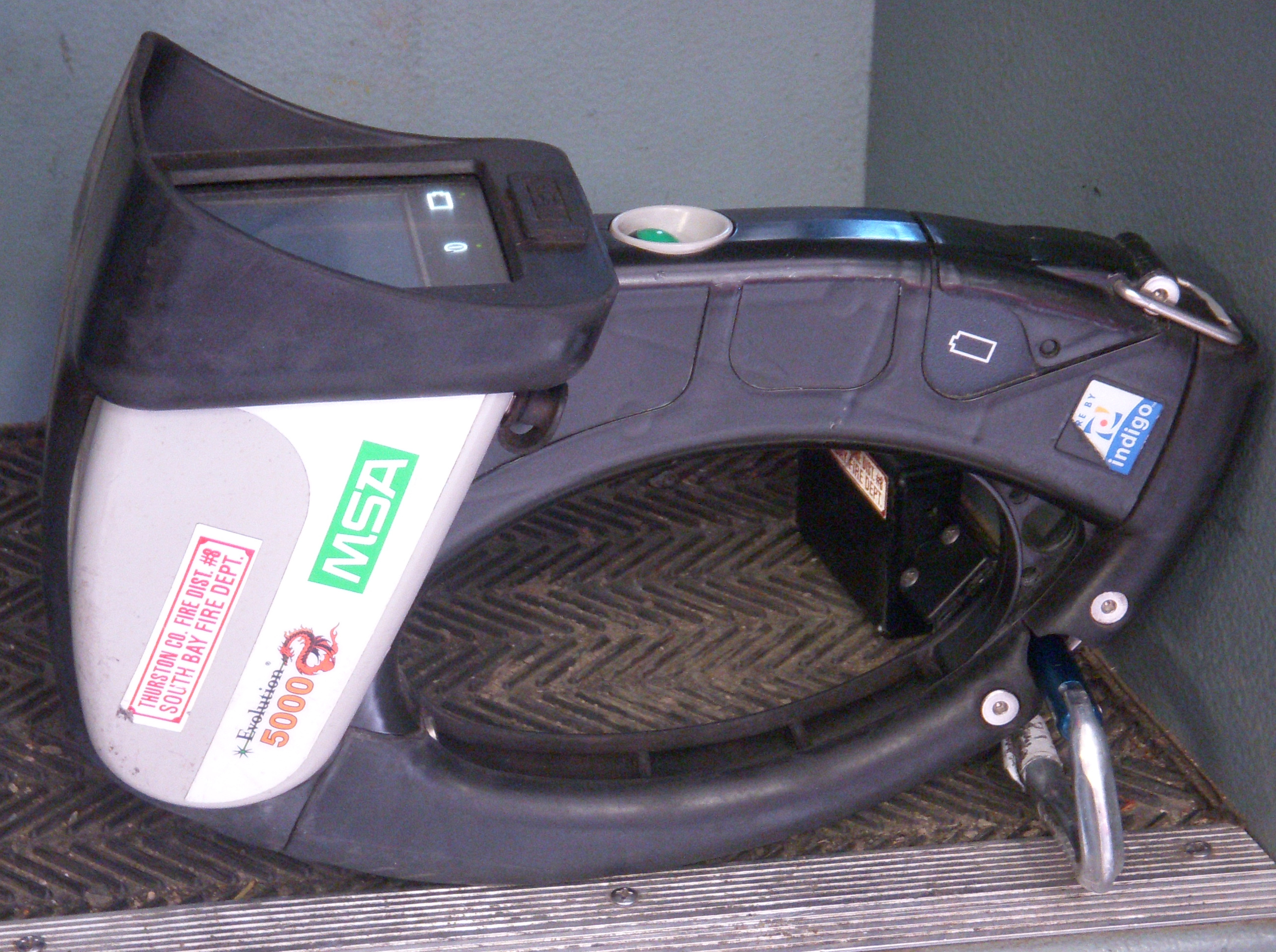
A handheld thermal imaging camera

A thermal imaging camera consists of five components: an optic system, detector, amplifier, signal processing, and display. Fire-service specific thermal imaging cameras incorporate these components in a heat-resistant, ruggedized, and waterproof housing. These parts work together to render infrared radiation, such as that given off by warm objects or flames, into a visible light representation in real time.

The camera display shows infrared output differentials, so two objects with the same temperature will appear to be the same "color". Many thermal imaging cameras use grayscale to represent normal temperature objects, but highlight dangerously hot surfaces in different colors.

Cameras may be handheld, helmet-mounted, or integrated into other equipment such as an SCBA. A handheld camera requires one hand to position and operate, leaving only one free hand for other tasks, but can be easily transferred between firefighters. The majority of thermal imaging cameras in use in the fire service are handheld models.

The National Institute of Standards and Technology Fire Research division is the lead government agency developing performance standards for fire service thermal imaging cameras in the United States, although the U.S. Army Night Vision Laboratory has contributed to the effort. Preliminary recommendations from the field include visible low-battery warnings, ability to withstand full immersion in water, and the ability to provide meaningful visual readouts beyond 2,000 °F (~1,100 °C).

== Usage ==
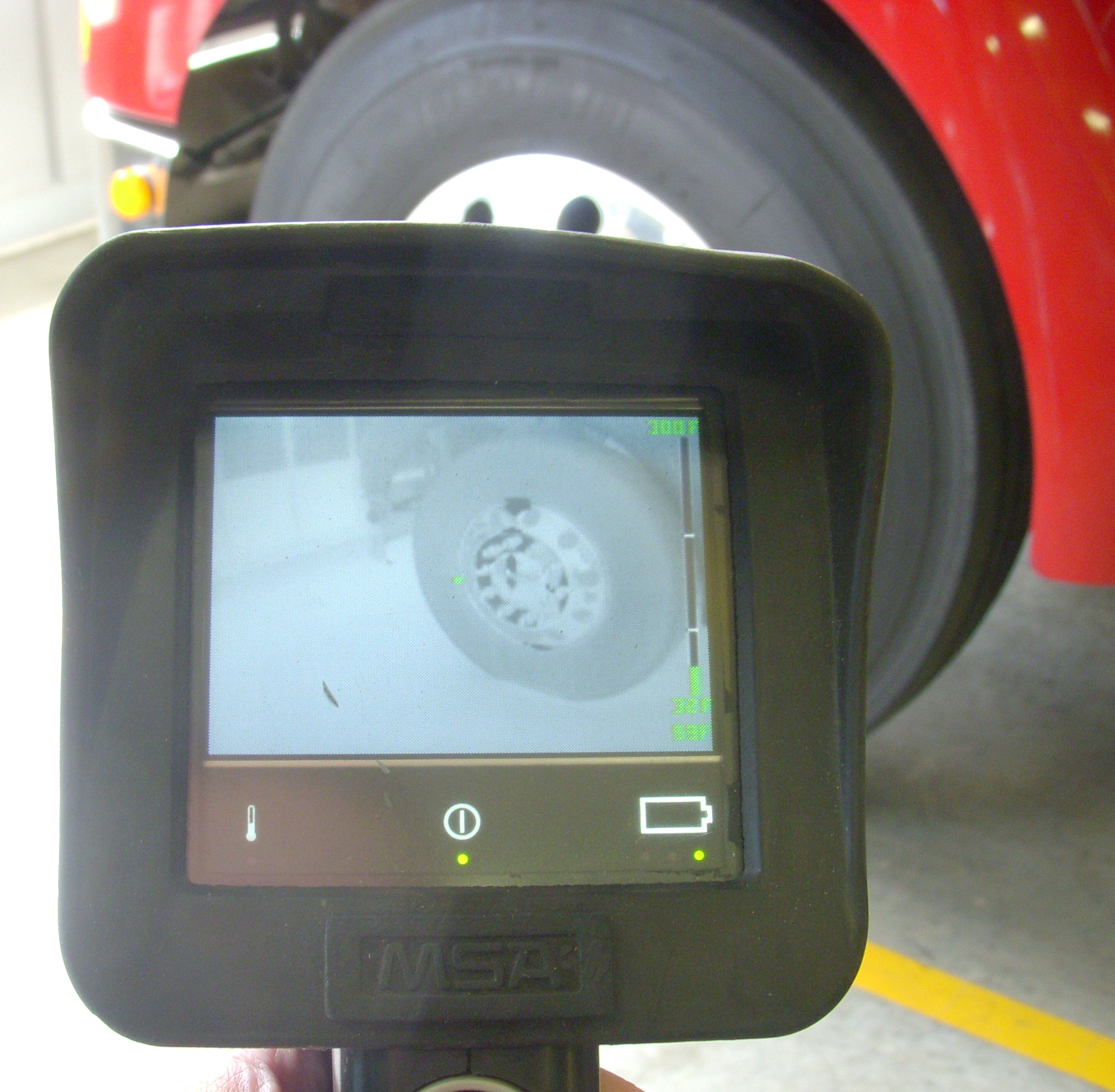
A view of a truck tire through a thermal imaging camera

Since thermal imaging cameras can "see" through darkness or smoke, they allow firefighters to quickly find the seat of a structure fire, or see the heat signature of visually obscured victims. They can be used to search for victims outdoors on a cool night, spot smoldering fires inside a wall, or detect overheating electrical wiring. Thermal imaging cameras were credited with saving multiple lives per year through victim identification and removal from low visibility conditions as early as 1999.

In addition to the ability to see through dense smoke, thermal imaging cameras also can see materials involved in spontaneous, low level combustion. In one documented instance, a TIC was used to isolate a smoldering hot spot in a grain storage facility; by isolating and removing only the affected grain, 75% of the stored crop was saved. In another, Tennessee firefighters used a thermal imaging camera to detect a hidden fire inside a cinder railroad bed, resulting in an estimated $500,000 cost avoidance. Thermal imaging cameras have also been reported to be particularly useful for fighting fires in cellulose insulation, and for ascertaining that a structure is safe to reenter after a fire has been put out. Ventura County, California firefighters used their TIC to find a cat which had become sealed inside a walkway during construction.

Prototypes of helmet-mounted thermal imaging cameras were first publicized in 1992, but a detailed evaluation of their performance in real world situations was not published until 2007. The model evaluated in 2007 weighed approximately 1.5 lbs, substantially increasing weight over an unadorned helmet. However, the ability to "use the devices while they were also pulling hose and carrying tools" was favorably received by firefighters evaluating the product.

Benefits of helmet mounted TICs included that multiple firefighters each observed different aspects of a fire, while drawbacks included firefighters relaxing safety discipline. In timed testing, teams of firefighters with helmet-mounted cameras completed search tasks substantially faster, were less disoriented, and used less air than teams with a single handheld camera, who in turn fared better than teams with no TIC at all.

A limitation of these and similar devices has been their poor depth perception (the user has a hard time judging how far away objects are). This increases the likelihood that the user will trip over or run into obstacles, or have other distance-related problems. An additional limitation of infrared technology is that since materials at the same temperature are shown as the same color, the display will not depict many details normally viewable in visible light.

Recent developments include mounting infrared cameras to drones. One use for such drones is detecting anomalies in solar farms. Where manual diagnostics would take weeks, the use of thermal cameras on drones takes days.

== History ==
While thermal imaging technology has long been in use in specialized law enforcement and military applications, its acceptance by the fire service has been hampered by the cost of the cameras. "The first documented civilian life saved with thermal imaging technology was following the 1985 Putney gas explosion in London.". While rapidly becoming standard in naval firefighting following the sinking of HMS Sheffield, thermal imaging remained specialist equipment in the civilian fire services through into the 1990s. The Seattle Fire Department acquired its first thermal imaging camera in 1997, for a cost of $16,000.

In 2000, the Los Angeles Times called the thermal imaging camera "[p]erhaps the best advance in fire equipment in the last 25 years—and the most expensive". Fire departments have pursued various sources and methods to fund thermal imaging cameras including direct budgeting, grants, and charity donations, among others. One fire chief observed that the same sorts of cost issues plagued SCBA acquisitions during their initial adoption.

In 2001, the Federal Emergency Management Agency (FEMA) began issuing grants under the Firefighter Investment and Response Enhancement (FIRE) Act, which provided $100 million to U.S. fire agencies during that fiscal year. Many departments used these funds to purchase thermal imaging cameras. However, replacing a damaged thermal imaging camera can be a substantial challenge for a department which acquired the camera outside the normal budget process.

As departments began acquiring thermal imaging cameras, they were typically assigned to specialized units, such as heavy rescue and truck companies. Thermal imaging cameras are routinely assigned to Rapid Intervention Teams, to enable them to more effectively reach and free trapped firefighters. Since 2003, the lack of a properly used thermal imaging camera has been recognized by NIOSH as an avoidable factor contributing to firefighter injuries and deaths, and the fact that a thermal imaging cameras not used was cited in a 2005 NIOSH report as a contributing factor to the 2004 line of duty death of Houston firefighter Kevin Kulow. One of the recommendations of the Charleston Sofa Super Store fire post incident assessment and review team was "the purchase of a standard model thermal imaging camera for each engine and ladder company".

== See also ==
- Flame detector – Sensor designed to detect flame or fire
- Night-vision device – Device that lets the user see in levels of visible light approaching total darkness
- Kyllo v. United States
