= Flame rectification =

Electrical rectifier

Flame rectification is a phenomenon in which a flame can act as an electrical rectifier. The effect is commonly described as being caused by the greater mobility of electrons relative to that of positive ions within the flame, and the asymmetric nature of the electrodes used to detect the phenomenon.

This effect is used by rectification flame sensors to detect the presence of flame. The rectifying effect of the flame on an AC voltage allows the presence of flame to be distinguished from a resistive leakage path.

One experimental study suggested that the effect is caused by the ionization process occurring mostly at the base of the flame, making it more difficult for the electrode further from the base of the flame to attract positive ions from the burner, yet leaving the electron current largely unchanged with distance because of the greater mobility of the electron charge carriers.

== See also ==
- Flame detection
- Flame supervision device
