= Auto reignition =

Gas-burner control process

Auto reignition is a process used in gas burners to control ignition devices based on whether a burner flame is lit. This information can be used to stop an ignition device from sparking, which is no longer necessary after the flame is lit. It can also be used to start the sparking device again if the flame goes out while the burner is still supplying gas, for example, from a gust of wind or vibration.
