= Pilot light =

Small gas flame used to light larger gas burner

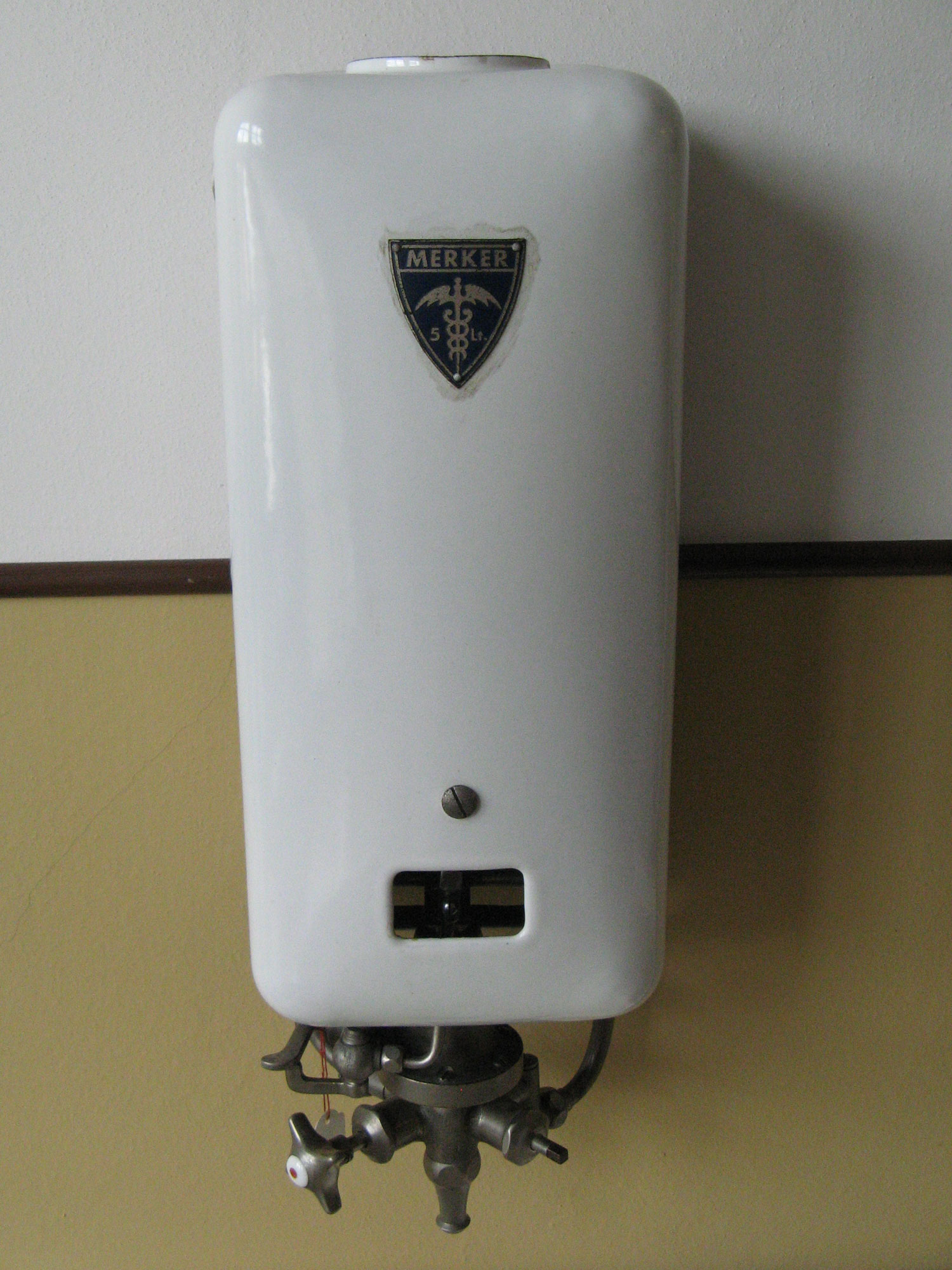
Merker tankless gas-fired water heater from the 1930s, with pilot light clearly visible through the aperture in the front cover. The large opening allowed for the manual lighting of the pilot light by a lit match or taper

A pilot light is a small gas flame, usually natural gas or liquefied petroleum gas, which serves as an ignition source for a more powerful gas burner. Originally a pilot light was kept permanently alight, but this wastes gas. Now it is more common to light a burner electrically, but gas pilot lights are still used when a high energy ignition source is necessary, as in when lighting a large burner.

A United States patent was filed May 13, 1922, for a "safety gas-control system" by two employees of the Newark, New Jersey–based Public Service Gas Company, Conrad Shuck, Jr. and George Layer.

The term "pilot light" is also used occasionally for an electrical indicator light that illuminates to show that electrical power is available, or that an electrical device is operating.

== Uses ==
Common applications include household water heaters, central heating systems, fireplaces, flamethrowers, and hot air balloons. While most commercial kitchens still rely on pilot lights for burners, ovens, and grills, current residential systems utilize an electrical ignition. This is more commonly known as standby on modern remote control fires.

== Safety protection ==
In natural gas furnaces, water heaters, and room heating systems, a safety cut-off switch is normally included so that the gas supply to the pilot and heating system is shut off by an electrically operated valve if the pilot light goes out. This cut-off switch usually detects the pilot light in one of several ways:

- A flame rectification device.
- A sensor filled with mercury is used to detect the heat of the pilot light. Contraction of the mercury results in sufficient pressure to operate an electrical switch that interrupts the flow of electricity and shuts off the gas valve when the pilot light goes out.
- A photoresistor is used to detect the light from the pilot lamp. When the pilot light goes out, electrical circuitry connected to the photoresistor shuts off the gas valve.
- Use of a pilot generator or a thermocouple in the flame provides heating appliance safety as it generates enough electric current from the burning flame to hold the gas valve open. If the pilot light goes out, the pilot generator cools off and the current stops, closing the gas valve.

Other units use a non-electrical approach, where the pilot heats a bimetallic element or a gas-filled tube to exert mechanical pressure to keep the gas valve open. If the pilot fails, the valve closes. To restart the system, the valve must be held open manually and the pilot lit, and then the valve must be held open until the element heats up enough to hold the valve open. Non-electrical schemes are appropriate for systems that do not use electricity.

The above methods are examples of the use of "fail-safe" safety protection.

== Energy waste ==
In domestic heating systems with pilot lights, it has been estimated that half of the total energy usage is from the pilot light, with each pilot light on average using between 70 and 500 watts of gas power (between 2 and 16 gigajoules/year). The heat from a pilot light in many appliances (furnaces, space heaters, water heaters) is generally released in the same chamber as the primary burner. The energy loss is much smaller for pilot lights in space heaters than other products, because space heaters heat a smaller enclosed space and contribute more significantly to heating the room. The appliance efficiency of a gas-fired balanced flue local space heater in pilot light mode is almost equal with the appliance efficiency measured at the reduced power of the appliance, which efficiency is between 65–95% based on the low calorific value of the consumed gas, making part of the pilot light's energy consumption into useful heat.

== Modern alternatives ==
=== Spark igniter ===
An alternative to the pilot light is a system to create a high voltage electrical arc or spark between two electrodes, in order to light the gas flowing to the burner. Fail-safe design for such a system requires the burner flame to be detected by passing an electric current through the flame, which is received by the flame rectification circuit inside an ignition controller connected to the gas valve. Flame rectification occurs when electrons flow through the flame burning, which the ignition controller senses and knows the flame is there, keeping the gas valve open. If the appliance loses gas or the flame goes out, the ignition controller does not see the flame, closing the gas valve.

=== Hot surface igniter ===
A red-hot surface can also be used to provide ignition. Such igniters are often made of silicon carbide, silicon nitride, or another material that is durable under prolonged exposure to extreme heat. Hot-surface igniters are commonly used in cooking ovens, boilers, and modern gas furnaces.

A disadvantage to modern alternatives requiring electricity is that the appliances are rendered useless during a power outage. Pilot light solutions work independently of the electrical system. However, some appliances can be lit with an external flame source during a power outage. This may include cooking stoves and ovens, but not heating boilers that are either room-sealed or rely on electricity to operate pumps.
