= Boron =

Boron, _{5}B
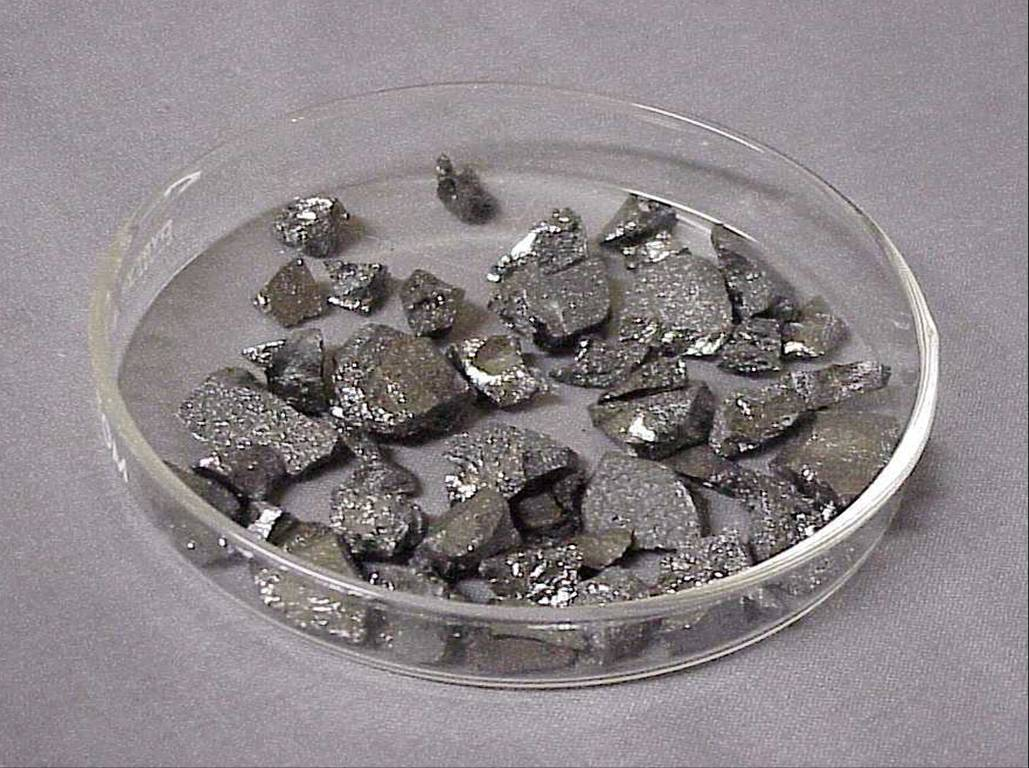
- boron (β-rhombohedral)

Boron
- Pronunciation: /ˈbɔːrɒn/ (BOR-on)
- Allotropes: α-, β-rhombohedral, β-tetragonal (and more)
- Appearance: black-brown

Standard atomic weight A_{r}°(B)
- [10.806, 10.821]; 10.81±0.02 (abridged)

Boron in the periodic table
Hydrogen																															Helium
Lithium	Beryllium																									Boron	Carbon	Nitrogen	Oxygen	Fluorine	Neon
Sodium	Magnesium																									Aluminium	Silicon	Phosphorus	Sulfur	Chlorine	Argon
Potassium	Calcium															Scandium	Titanium	Vanadium	Chromium	Manganese	Iron	Cobalt	Nickel	Copper	Zinc	Gallium	Germanium	Arsenic	Selenium	Bromine	Krypton
Rubidium	Strontium															Yttrium	Zirconium	Niobium	Molybdenum	Technetium	Ruthenium	Rhodium	Palladium	Silver	Cadmium	Indium	Tin	Antimony	Tellurium	Iodine	Xenon
Caesium	Barium	Lanthanum	Cerium	Praseodymium	Neodymium	Promethium	Samarium	Europium	Gadolinium	Terbium	Dysprosium	Holmium	Erbium	Thulium	Ytterbium	Lutetium	Hafnium	Tantalum	Tungsten	Rhenium	Osmium	Iridium	Platinum	Gold	Mercury (element)	Thallium	Lead	Bismuth	Polonium	Astatine	Radon
Francium	Radium	Actinium	Thorium	Protactinium	Uranium	Neptunium	Plutonium	Americium	Curium	Berkelium	Californium	Einsteinium	Fermium	Mendelevium	Nobelium	Lawrencium	Rutherfordium	Dubnium	Seaborgium	Bohrium	Hassium	Meitnerium	Darmstadtium	Roentgenium	Copernicium	Nihonium	Flerovium	Moscovium	Livermorium	Tennessine	Oganesson
–
↑
B
↓
Al
beryllium ← boron → carbon
- Atomic number (Z): 5
- Group: group 13 (boron group)
- Period: period 2
- Block: p-block
- Electron configuration: [He] 2s^{2} 2p^{1}
- Electrons per shell: 2, 3

Physical properties
- Phase at STP: solid
- Melting point: 2349 K (2076 °C, 3769 °F)
- Boiling point: 4200 K (3927 °C, 7101 °F)
- Density when liquid (at m.p.): 2.08 g/cm^{3}
- Heat of fusion: 50.2 kJ/mol
- Heat of vaporization: 508 kJ/mol
- Molar heat capacity: 11.087 J/(mol·K)
- Specific heat capacity: 1025.624 J/(kg·K)
Vapor pressure
P (Pa)	1	10	100	1 k	10 k	100 k
at T (K)	2348	2562	2822	3141	3545	4072

Atomic properties
- Oxidation states: common: +3 −5, −1, 0, +1, +2
- Electronegativity: Pauling scale: 2.04
- Ionization energies: 1st: 800.6 kJ/mol; 2nd: 2427.1 kJ/mol; 3rd: 3659.7 kJ/mol; (more)
- Atomic radius: empirical: 90 pm
- Covalent radius: 84±3 pm
- Van der Waals radius: 192 pm
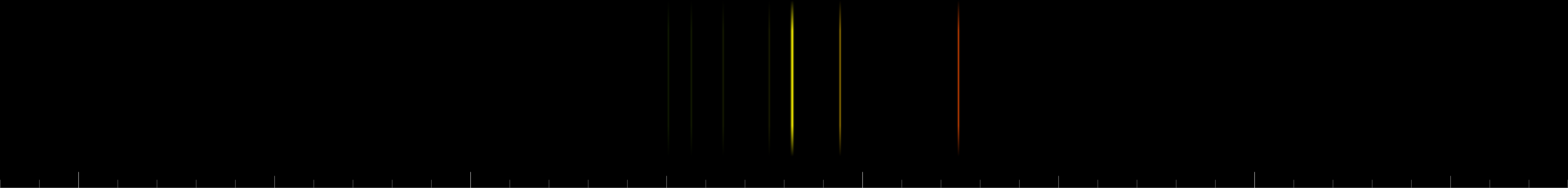
- Spectral lines of boron

Other properties
- Natural occurrence: primordial
- Crystal structure: rhombohedral
- Thermal expansion: β form: 5–7 µm/(m⋅K) (at 25 °C)
- Thermal conductivity: 27.4 W/(m⋅K)
- Electrical resistivity: ~10^{6} Ω⋅m (at 20 °C)
- Magnetic ordering: diamagnetic
- Molar magnetic susceptibility: −6.7×10^{−6} cm^{3}/mol
- Speed of sound thin rod: 16,200 m/s (at 20 °C)
- Mohs hardness: ~9.5
- CAS Number: 7440-42-8

History
- Naming: after borax, from which it was isolated; Ultimately from Arabic بَوْرَق (bawraq)
- Discovery: Joseph Louis Gay-Lussac and Louis Jacques Thénard (30 June 1808)
- First isolation: Humphry Davy (9 July 1808)

Isotopes of boron
Main isotopes			Decay	
Isotope	abundance	half-life (t_{1/2})	mode	product
^{8}B	synth	771.9 ms	β^{+}	^{8}Be
^{10}B	[18.9%, 20.4%]	stable		
^{11}B	[79.6%, 81.1%]	stable		

Boron is a chemical element; it has symbol B and atomic number 5. In its crystalline form it is a brittle, dark, lustrous metalloid; in its amorphous form it is a brown powder. As the lightest element of the boron group it has three valence electrons for forming covalent bonds, resulting in many compounds such as boric acid, the mineral sodium borate, and the ultra-hard crystals of boron carbide and boron nitride.

Boron is synthesized entirely by cosmic ray spallation and supernovas and not by stellar nucleosynthesis, so it is a low-abundance element in the Solar System and in the Earth's crust. It constitutes about 0.001 percent by weight of Earth's crust. It is concentrated on Earth by the water-solubility of its more common naturally occurring compounds, the borate minerals. These are mined industrially as evaporites, such as borax and kernite. The largest known deposits are in Turkey, the largest producer of boron minerals.

Elemental boron is found in small amounts in meteoroids, but chemically uncombined boron is not otherwise found naturally on Earth.

Several allotropes exist: amorphous boron is a brown powder; crystalline boron is silvery to black, extremely hard (9.3 on the Mohs scale), and a poor electrical conductor at room temperature (1.5 × 10^{−6} Ω^{−1} cm^{−1} room temperature electrical conductivity). The primary use of the element itself is as boron filaments with applications similar to carbon fibers in some high-strength materials.

Boron is primarily used in chemical compounds. About half of all production consumed globally is an additive in fiberglass for insulation and structural materials. The next leading use is in polymers and ceramics in high-strength, lightweight structural and heat-resistant materials. Borosilicate glass is desired for its greater strength and thermal shock resistance than ordinary soda lime glass. As sodium perborate, it is used as a bleach. A small amount is used as a dopant in semiconductors and reagent intermediates in the synthesis of organic fine chemicals. A few boron-containing organic pharmaceuticals are used or are in study. Natural boron is composed of two stable isotopes, one of which (boron-10) has a number of uses as a neutron-capturing agent.

Borates have low toxicity in mammals (similar to table salt) but are more toxic to arthropods and are occasionally used as insecticides. Boron-containing organic antibiotics are known. Although only traces are required, boron is an essential plant nutrient.

== History ==
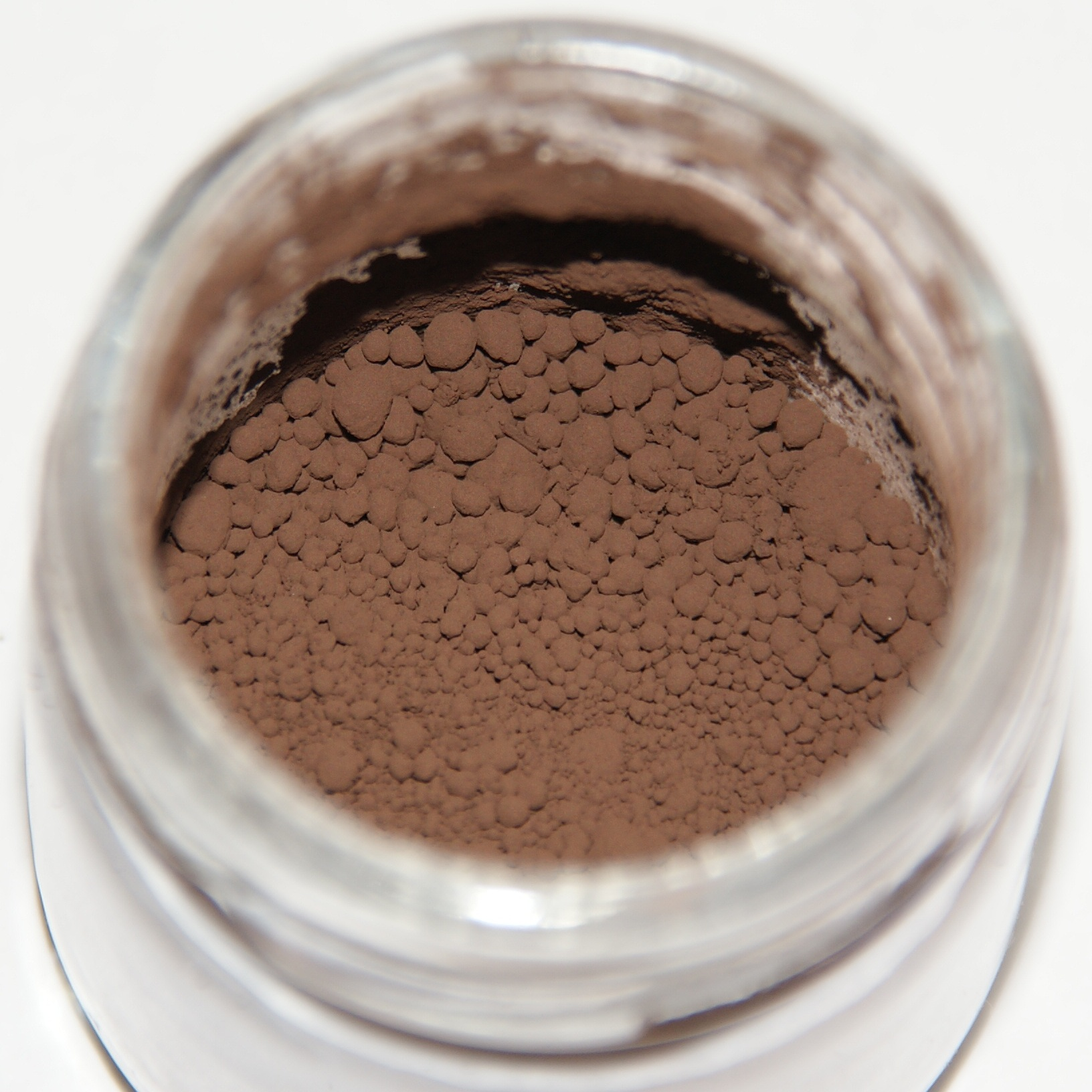
Amorphous boron powder

The word boron was coined from borax, the mineral from which it was isolated, by analogy with carbon, which boron resembles chemically.

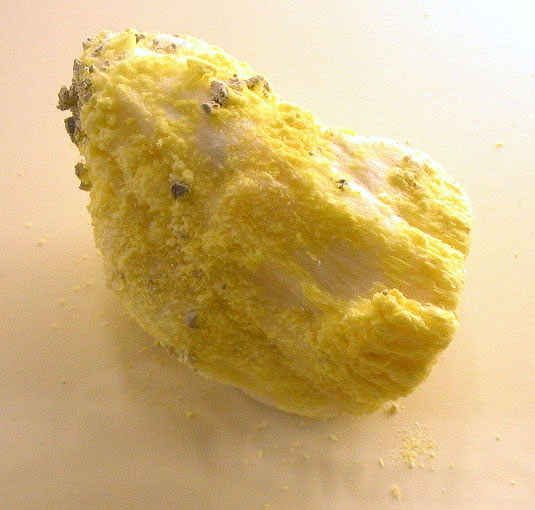
Sassolite

Borax in its mineral form (then known as tincal) first saw use as a glaze, beginning in China circa 300 AD. Some crude borax traveled westward, and was apparently mentioned by the alchemist Jabir ibn Hayyan around 700 AD. Marco Polo brought some glazes back to Italy in the 13th century. Georgius Agricola, in around 1600, reported the use of borax as a flux in metallurgy. In 1777, boric acid was recognized in the hot springs (soffioni) near Florence, Italy, at which point it became known as sal sedativum, with ostensible medical benefits. The mineral was named sassolite after Sasso Pisano in Italy. Sasso was the main source of European borax from 1827 to 1872, when American sources replaced it. Boron compounds were rarely used until the late 1800s when Francis Marion Smith's Pacific Coast Borax Company first popularized and produced them in volume at low cost.

Boron was not recognized as an element until it was isolated by Sir Humphry Davy and by Joseph Louis Gay-Lussac and Louis Jacques Thénard. In 1808, Davy observed that electric current sent through a solution of borates produced a brown precipitate on one of the electrodes. In his subsequent experiments, he used potassium to reduce boric acid instead of electrolysis. He produced enough boron to confirm a new element and named it boracium. Gay-Lussac and Thénard used iron to reduce boric acid at high temperatures. By oxidizing boron with air, they showed that boric acid is its oxidation product. Jöns Jacob Berzelius identified it as an element in 1824. Pure boron was arguably first produced by the American chemist Ezekiel Weintraub in 1909.

== Characteristics of the element ==
=== Isotopes ===
Boron has two naturally occurring and stable isotopes, ^{11}B (80.1%) and ^{10}B (19.9%). The mass difference results in a wide range of δ^{11}B values, which are defined as a fractional difference between the ^{11}B and ^{10}B and traditionally expressed in parts per thousand, in natural waters ranging from −16 to +59. There are 13 known isotopes of boron; the shortest-lived isotope is ^{7}B which decays through proton emission and alpha decay with a half-life of 3.5×10^{−22} s. Isotopic fractionation of boron is controlled by the exchange reactions of the boron species B(OH)_{3} and [B(OH)_{4}]^{−}. Boron isotopes are also fractionated during mineral crystallization, during H_{2}O phase changes in hydrothermal systems, and during hydrothermal alteration of rock. The latter effect results in preferential removal of the [^{10}B(OH)_{4}]^{−} ion onto clays. It results in solutions enriched in ^{11}B(OH)_{3} and therefore may be responsible for the large ^{11}B enrichment in seawater relative to both oceanic crust and continental crust; this difference may act as an isotopic signature.

The exotic ^{17}B exhibits a nuclear halo, i.e. its radius is appreciably larger than that predicted by the liquid drop model.

==== NMR spectroscopy ====
Both ^{10}B and ^{11}B possess nuclear spin. The nuclear spin of ^{10}B is 3 and that of ^{11}B is 3/2. These isotopes are therefore of use in nuclear magnetic resonance spectroscopy, and spectrometers specially adapted to detecting the boron-11 nuclei are available commercially. The ^{10}B and ^{11}B nuclei also cause splitting in the resonances of attached nuclei.

=== Allotropes ===
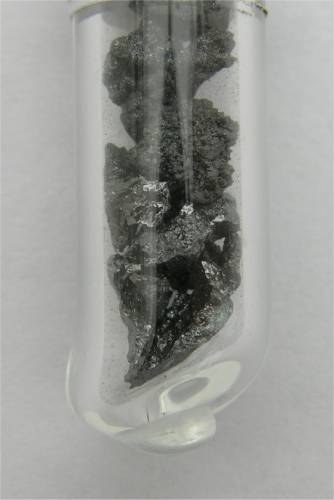
Boron chunks

Boron forms four major allotropes: α-rhombohedral and β-rhombohedral (α-R and β-R), γ-orthorhombic (γ), and β-tetragonal (β-T). All four phases are stable at ambient conditions. β-rhombohedral is the most stable and the most common. An α-tetragonal phase also exists (α-T) but is difficult to produce without significant contamination. Most of the phases are based on B_{12} icosahedra, but the γ phase can be described as a rocksalt-type arrangement of the icosahedra and B_{2} atomic pairs. It can be produced by compressing other boron phases to 12–20 GPa and heating to 1500–1800 °C; it remains stable after releasing the temperature and pressure. The β-T phase is produced at similar pressures, but higher temperatures of 1800–2200 °C. The α-T and β-T phases might coexist at ambient conditions, with the β-T phase being the more stable. Compressing boron above 160 GPa produces a boron phase with an as yet unknown structure, and this phase is a superconductor at temperatures below 6–12 K.

Boron phase	α-R	β-R	γ	β-T
Symmetry	Rhombohedral	Rhombohedral	Orthorhombic	Tetragonal
Atoms/unit cell	12	~105	28	
Density (g/cm^{3})	2.46	2.35	2.52	2.36
Vickers hardness (GPa)	42	45	50–58	
Bulk modulus (GPa)	185	224	227	
Bandgap (eV)	2	1.6	2.1	

=== Atomic structure ===
Atomic boron is the lightest element having an electron in a p-orbital in its ground state. Its first three ionization energies are higher than those for heavier group III elements, reflecting its electropositive character.

== Chemistry of the element ==
=== Preparation ===
Elemental boron is rare and poorly studied because the pure material is extremely difficult to prepare. Most studies of "boron" involve samples that contain small amounts of carbon. Highly pure boron is produced with difficulty because of contamination by carbon or other elements that resist removal.

Some early routes to elemental boron involved the reduction of boric oxide with metals such as magnesium or aluminium. However, the product was often contaminated with borides of those metals. Pure boron can be prepared by reducing volatile boron halides with hydrogen at high temperatures. Ultrapure boron for use in the semiconductor industry is produced by the decomposition of diborane at high temperatures and then further purified by the zone melting or Czochralski processes.

=== Reactions of the element ===
Crystalline boron is a hard, black material with a melting point of above 2000 °C. Crystalline boron is chemically inert and resistant to attack by boiling hydrofluoric or hydrochloric acid. When finely divided, it is attacked slowly by hot concentrated hydrogen peroxide, hot concentrated nitric acid, hot sulfuric acid, or hot mixture of sulfuric and chromic acids.

Since elemental boron is rare, its chemical reactions are of little significance. The elemental form is not typically used as a precursor to compounds. Instead, boron compounds are produced from borates.

When exposed to air, under normal conditions, a protective oxide or hydroxide layer forms on the surface of boron, which prevents further corrosion. The rate of oxidation of boron depends on the crystallinity, particle size, purity and temperature. At higher temperatures boron burns to form boron trioxide:

4 B + 3 O_{2} → 2 B_{2}O_{3}

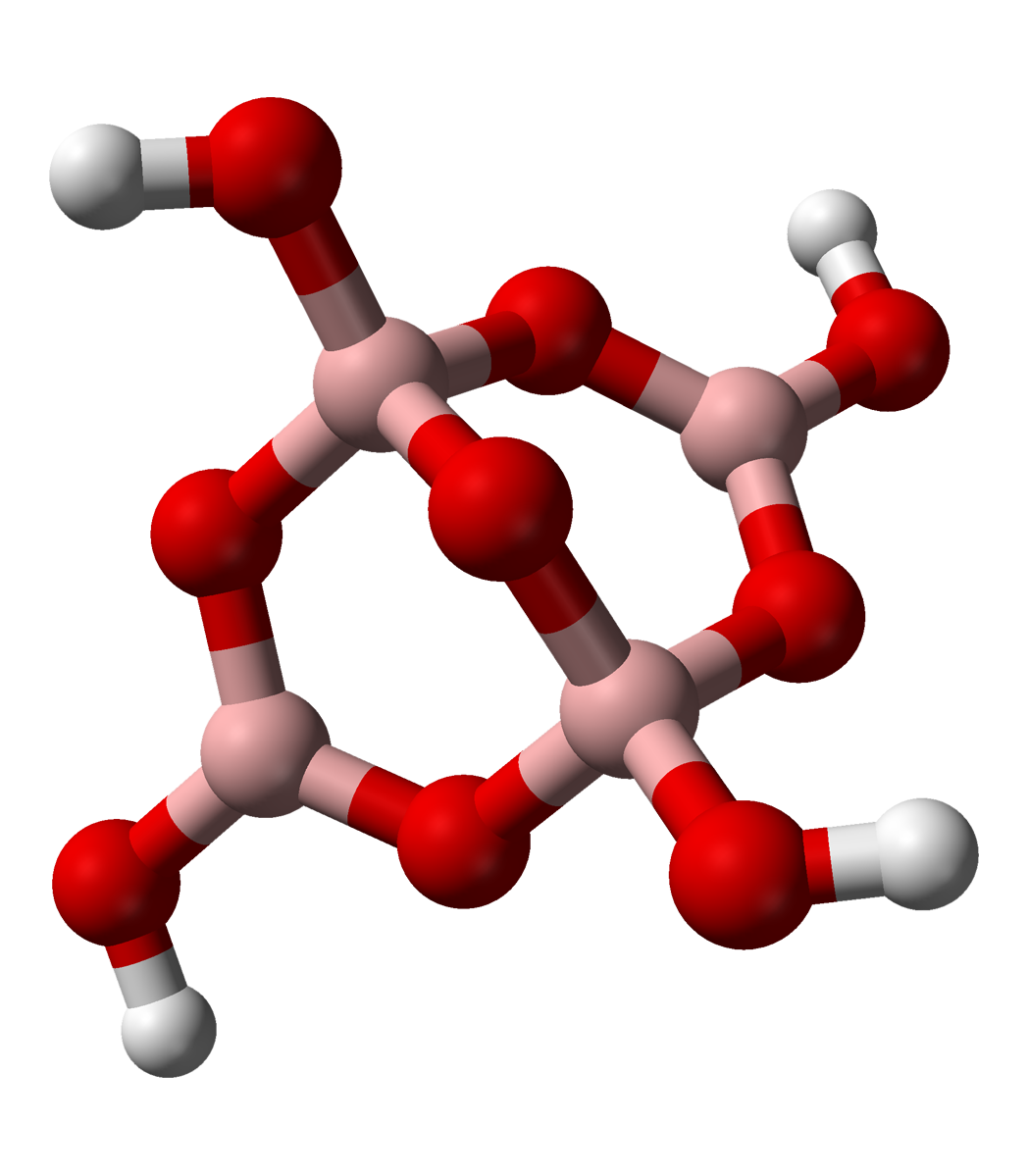
Ball-and-stick model of tetraborate anion, [B_{4}O_{5}(OH)_{4}]^{2−}, as it occurs in crystalline borax, Na_{2}[B_{4}O_{5}(OH)_{4}]·8H_{2}O. Boron atoms are pink, with bridging oxygens in red, and four hydroxyl hydrogens in white. Note two borons are trigonally bonded sp^{2} with no formal charge, while the other two borons are tetrahedrally bonded sp^{3}, each carrying a formal charge of −1. The oxidation state of all borons is III. This mixture of boron coordination numbers and formal charges is characteristic of natural boron minerals.

== Chemical compounds ==
=== General trends ===
In some ways, boron is comparable to carbon in its capability to form stable covalently bonded molecular networks (even nominally disordered (amorphous) boron contains boron icosahedra, which are bonded randomly to each other without long-range order.). In terms of chemical behavior, boron compounds resemble silicon due to their diagonal relationship. Aluminium, the heavier congener of boron, does not behave analogously to boron: it is far more electropositive, it is larger, and it tends not to form homoatomic Al-Al bonds. In the most familiar compounds, boron has the formal oxidation state III. These include the common oxides, sulfides, nitrides, and halides, as well as organic derivatives.

Boron compounds often violate the octet rule.

=== Halides ===
Boron forms the complete series of trihalides, i.e. BX_{3} (X = F, Cl, Br, I). The trifluoride is produced by treating borate salts with hydrogen fluoride, while the trichloride is produced by carbothermic reduction of boron oxides in the presence of chlorine gas:

B_{2}O_{3} + 3 C + 6 Cl_{2} → 2 BCl_{3} + 3 CO

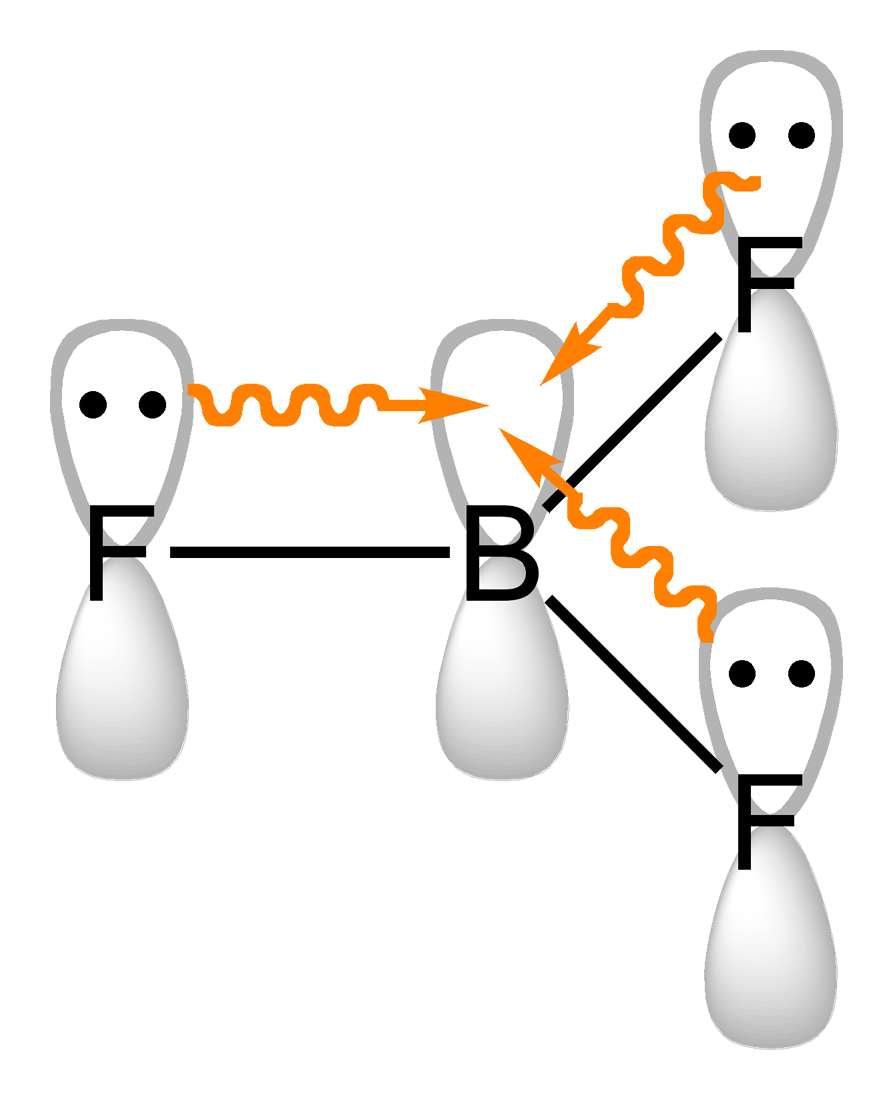
Boron (III) trifluoride structure, showing "empty" boron p orbital in pi-type coordinate covalent bonds

The trihalides adopt a planar trigonal structures, in contrast to the behavior of aluminium trihalides. All charge-neutral boron halides violate the octet rule; hence, they are typically Lewis acidic. For example, boron trifluoride (BF_{3}) combines eagerly with fluoride sources to give the tetrafluoroborate anion, BF_{4}^{−}. Boron trifluoride is used in the petrochemical industry as a catalyst. The halides react with water to form boric acid. Other boron halides include those with B-B bonding, such as B_{2}F_{4} and B_{4}Cl_{4}. Larger polyhedral boron(I) halides also exist, e.g. B_{7}Br_{7}, B_{8}Cl_{8} and B_{9}I_{9}.

=== Oxide derivatives ===
Boron-containing minerals exclusively exist as oxides of B(III), often associated with other elements. More than one hundred borate minerals are known. These minerals resemble silicates in some respect, although it is often found not only in a tetrahedral coordination with oxygen, but also in a trigonal planar configuration. The borates can be subdivided into two classes, anhydrous and the far more common hydrates. The hydrates contain B-OH groups and sometimes water of crystallization. A typical motif is exemplified by the tetraborate anions of the common mineral borax. The formal negative charge of the tetrahedral borate center is balanced by sodium (Na^{+}). Some of the complexity of the borates is exemplified by the inventory of zinc borates, which are common wood preservatives and fire retardants: 4ZnO·B_{2}O_{3}·H_{2}O, ZnO·B_{2}O_{3}·1.12H_{2}O, ZnO·B_{2}O_{3}·2H_{2}O, 6ZnO·5B_{2}O_{3}·3H_{2}O, 2ZnO·3B_{2}O_{3}·7H_{2}O, 2ZnO·3B_{2}O_{3}·3H_{2}O, 3ZnO·5B_{2}O_{3}·14H_{2}O, and ZnO·5B_{2}O_{3}·4.5H_{2}O.

As illustrated by the preceding examples, borate anions tend to condense by formation of B-O-B bonds. Borosilicates, with B-O-Si, and borophosphates, with B-O-P linkages, are also well represented in both minerals and synthetic compounds.

Related to the oxides are the alkoxides and boronic acids with the formula B(OR)_{3} and R_{2}BOH, respectively. Boron forms a wide variety of such metal-organic compounds, some of which are used in the synthesis of pharmaceuticals. These developments, especially the Suzuki reaction, was recognized with the 2010 Nobel Prize in Chemistry to Akira Suzuki.

=== Hydrides ===
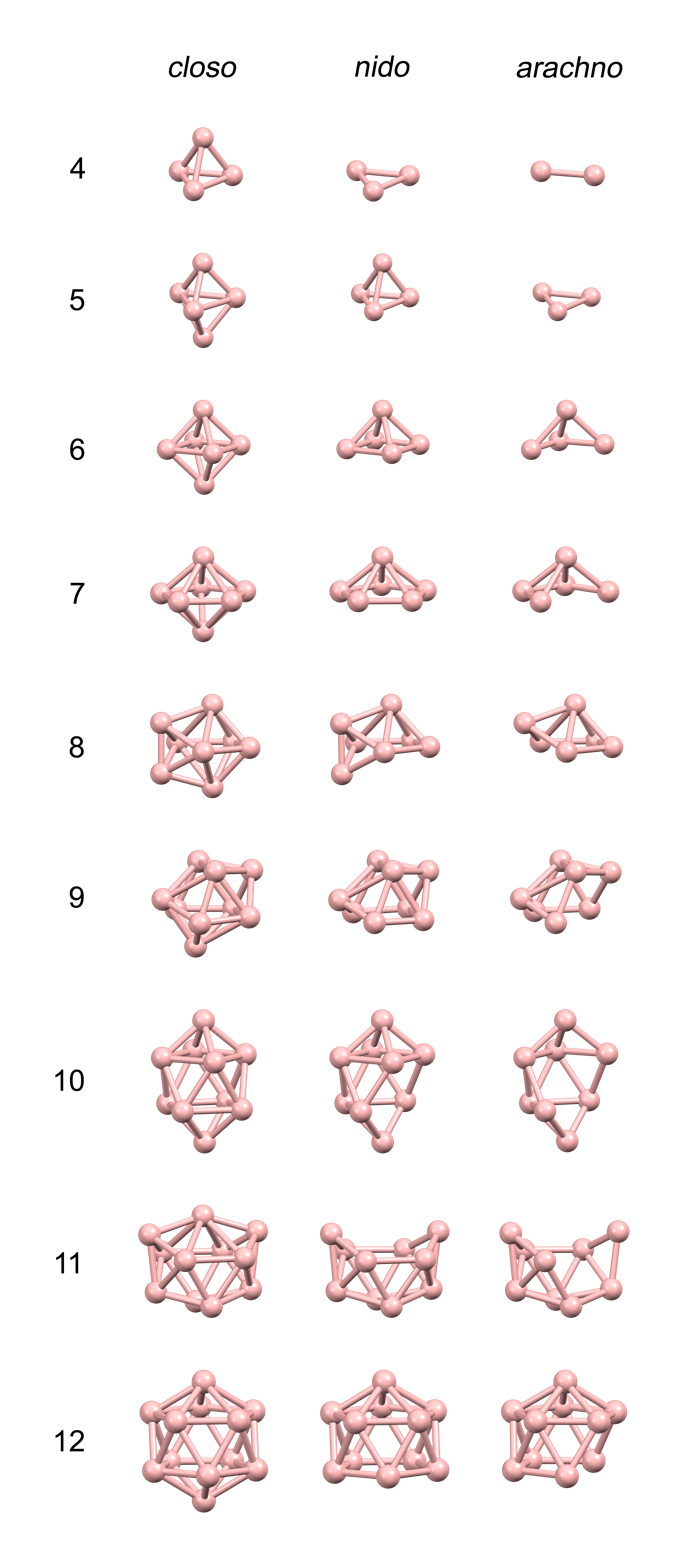
Ball-and-stick models showing the structures of the boron skeletons of borane clusters. The structures can be rationalised by polyhedral skeletal electron pair theory.

Boranes and borohydrides are compounds of boron and hydrogen that are neutral and anionic, respectively. Sodium borohydride is the progenitor of the boranes. Sodium borohydride is obtained by hydrogenation of trimethylborate:

B(OCH_{3})_{3} + 4 Na + 2H_{2} → NaBH_{4} + 3 NaOCH_{3}

Sodium borohydride is a white, fairly air-stable salt, and it converts to diborane by treatment with boron trifluoride:

3 NaBH_{4} + 4 BF_{3} → 2 (BH_{3})_{2} + 3 NaBF_{4}

Diborane is the dimer of the parent called borane, BH_{3}. Having a formula akin to ethane's (C_{2}H_{6}), diborane adopts a markedly different structure, featuring a pair of bridging H atoms. This unusual structure, which was deduced only in the 1940s, was an early indication of the complexity of boron chemistry.

Structure of diborane

Pyrolysis of diborane gives boron hydride clusters such as pentaborane(9) B_{5}H_{9} and decaborane B_{10}H_{14}. A large number of anionic boron hydrides are also known, e.g. [B_{3}H_{8}]^{−} and [B_{12}H_{12}]^{2−}. In these cluster compounds, boron has a coordination number greater than four. When at least one boron atom is replaced by another elements, heteroboranes are formed. They have similar structures of their parent boranes. The analysis of the bonding in these polyhedra clusters earned William N. Lipscomb the 1976 Nobel Prize in Chemistry for "studies on the structure of boranes illuminating problems of chemical bonding". Not only are their structures unusual, many of the boranes are extremely reactive. For example, a widely used procedure for pentaborane states that it will "spontaneously inflame or explode in air".

=== Organoboron compounds ===
A large number of organoboron compounds, species with B-C bonds, are known. Many organoboron compounds are produced from hydroboration, the addition of B-H bonds to C=C and C≡C bonds. Diborane is traditionally used for such reactions, as illustrated by the preparation of trioctylborane:

B_{2}H_{6} + 6 H_{2}C=CH(CH_{2})_{5}CH_{3} → 2 B((CH_{2})_{7}CH_{3})_{3}

This regiochemistry, i.e. the tendency of B to attach to the terminal carbon - is explained by the polarization of the bonds in boranes, which is indicated as B^{δ+}-H^{δ-}.

Hydroboration opened the doors for many subsequent reactions, several of which are useful in the synthesis of complex organic compounds. The significance of these methods was recognized by the award of Nobel Prize in Chemistry to H. C. Brown in 1979. Even complicated boron hydrides, such as decaborane, undergo hydroboration. Like the volatile boranes, the alkyl boranes ignite spontaneously in air.

In the 1950s, several studies examined the use of boranes as energy-increasing "Zip fuel" additives for jet fuel.

Triorganoboron(III) compounds are trigonal planar and exhibit weak Lewis acidity. The resulting adducts are tetrahedral. This behavior contrasts with that of triorganoaluminium compounds (see trimethylaluminium), which are tetrahedral with bridging alkyl groups.

A compound with the B≡C triple bond was synthesized for the first time in 2025.

=== Nitrides ===
The boron-nitrides follow the pattern of avoiding B-B and N-N bonds; only B-N bonding is observed generally. The boron nitrides exhibit structures analogous to various allotropes of carbon, including graphite, diamond, and nanotubes. This similarity reflects the fact that B and N have eight valence electrons as does a pair of carbon atoms. In cubic boron nitride (tradename Borazon), boron and nitrogen atoms are tetrahedral, just like carbon in diamond. Cubic boron nitride, among other applications, is used as an abrasive, as its hardness is comparable with that of diamond. Hexagonal boron nitride (h-BN) is the BN analogue of graphite, consisting of sheets of alternating B and N atoms. These sheets stack with boron and nitrogen in registry between the sheets. Graphite and h-BN have markedly different properties, although both are lubricants, as these planes slip past each other easily. However, h-BN is a relatively poor electrical and thermal conductor in the planar directions. Molecular analogues of boron nitrides are represented by borazine, (BH)_{3}(NH)_{3}.

=== Carbides ===
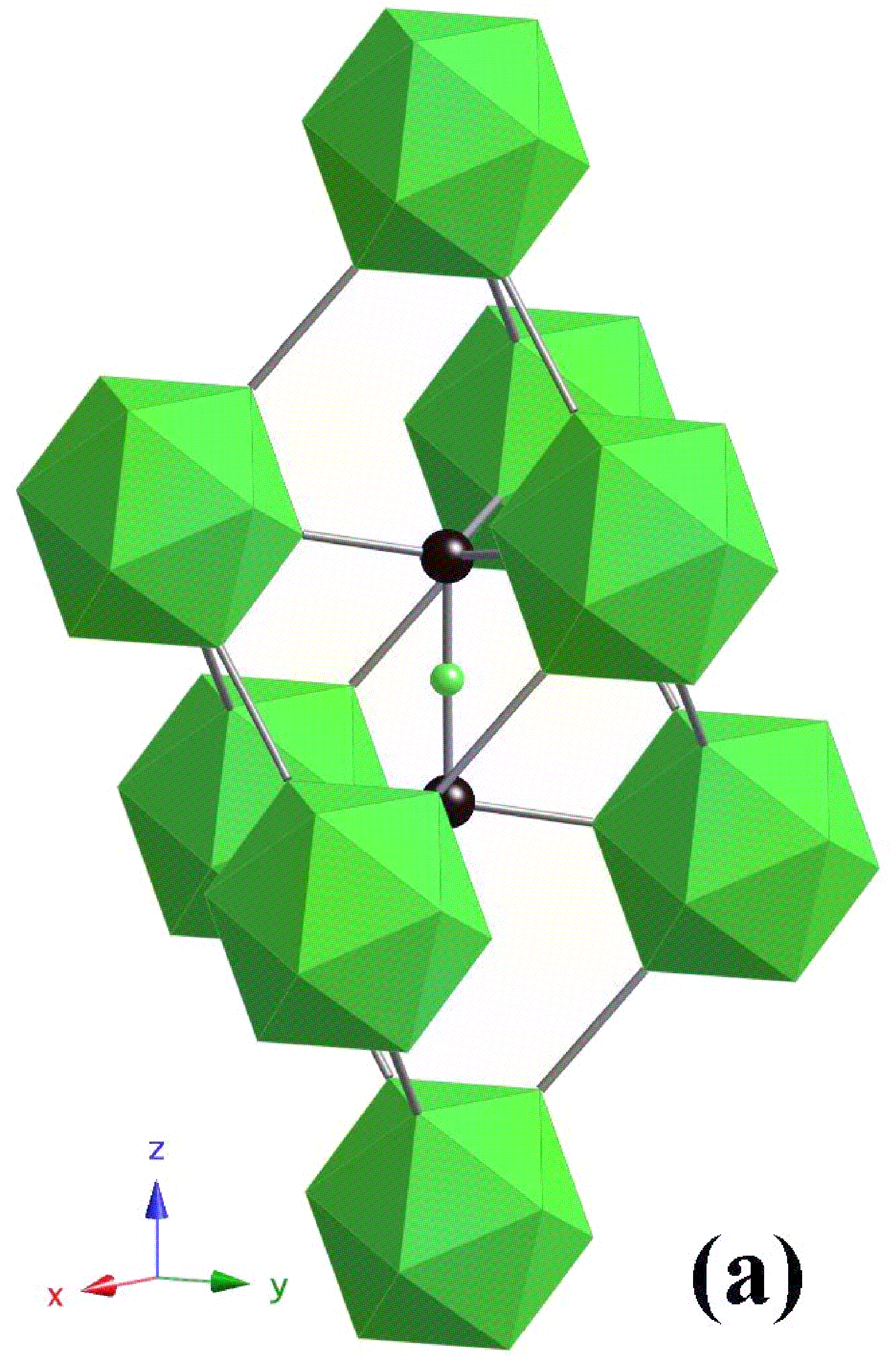
Unit cell of B_{4}C. The green sphere and icosahedra consist of boron atoms, and black spheres are carbon atoms.

Boron carbide is a ceramic material. It is obtained by carbothermal reduction of B_{2}O_{3} in an electric furnace:

2 B_{2}O_{3} + 7 C → B_{4}C + 6 CO

Boron carbide's structure is only approximately reflected in its formula of B_{4}C, and it shows a clear depletion of carbon from this suggested stoichiometric ratio. This is due to its complex structure. The substance can be seen with empirical formula B_{12}C_{3} (i.e., with B_{12} dodecahedra being a motif), but with less carbon, as the suggested C_{3} units are replaced with C-B-C chains, and some smaller (B_{6}) octahedra are present as well (see the boron carbide article for structural analysis). The repeating polymer plus semi-crystalline structure of boron carbide gives it great structural strength per weight.

=== Borides ===
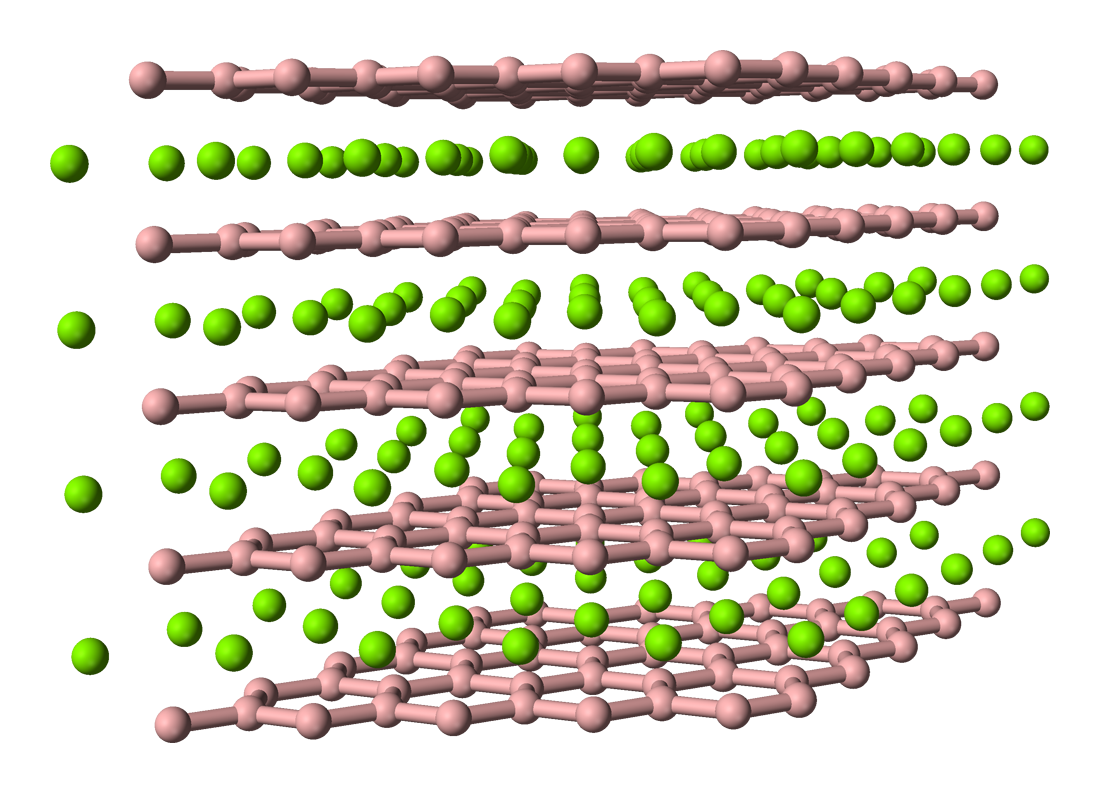
Ball-and-stick model of superconductor magnesium diboride. Boron atoms lie in hexagonal aromatic graphite-like layers, with a charge of −1 on each boron atom. Magnesium(II) ions lie between layers

Binary metal-boron compounds, the metal borides, contain only boron and a metal. They are metallic, exceptionally hard, with high melting points. TiB_{2}, ZrB_{2}, and HfB_{2} have melting points above 3000 °C. The borides can be classified loosely as boron rich or metal rich, for example the compound YB_{66} at one extreme through to Nd_{2}Fe_{14}B at the other. The generally accepted definition is that if the ratio of boron atoms to metal atoms is 4:1 or more, the compound is boron rich; if it is less, then it is metal rich. Some metal borides find specialized applications as hard materials for cutting tools.

== Occurrence ==
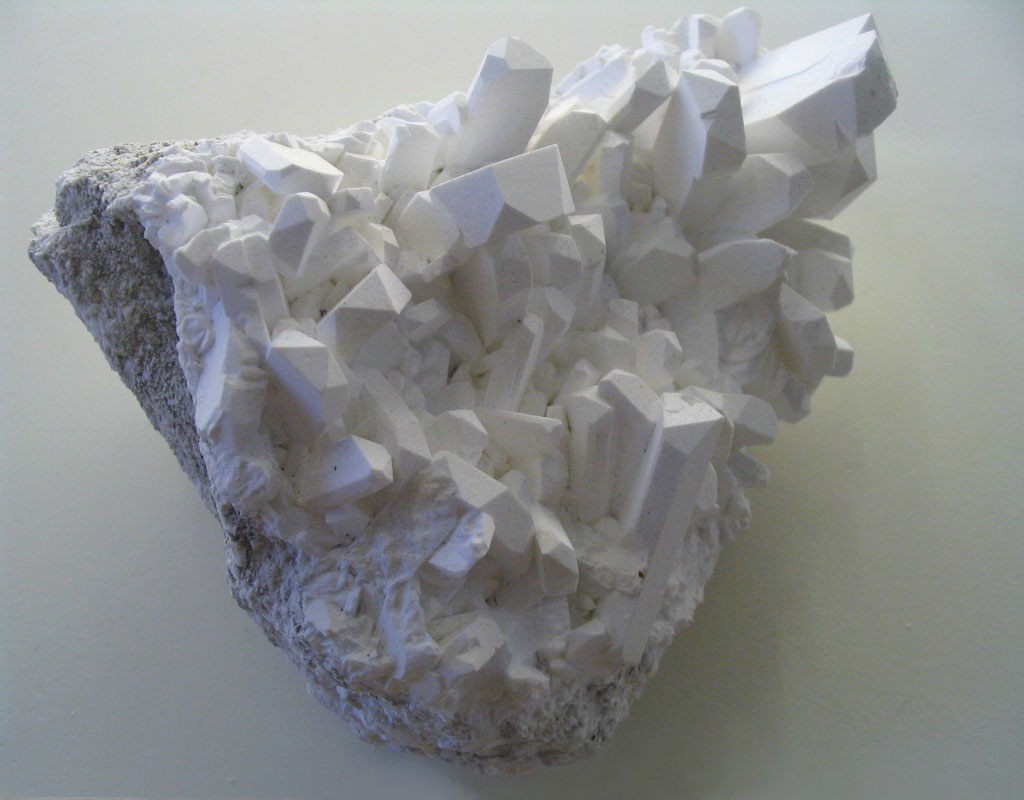
Borax crystals

Boron is rare in the universe and Solar System. The amount of boron formed in the Big Bang was negligible. Boron is not generated in the normal course of stellar nucleosynthesis, and is destroyed in stellar interiors.

In the high oxygen environment of the Earth's surface, boron is always found fully oxidized to borate. Boron does not appear on Earth in elemental form. Extremely small traces of elemental boron were detected in Lunar regolith.

Although boron is a relatively rare element in the Earth's crust, representing only 0.001% of the crust mass, it can be highly concentrated by the action of water, in which many borates are soluble. It is found naturally combined in compounds such as borax and boric acid (sometimes found in volcanic spring waters). Over a hundred borate minerals are known.

== Production ==
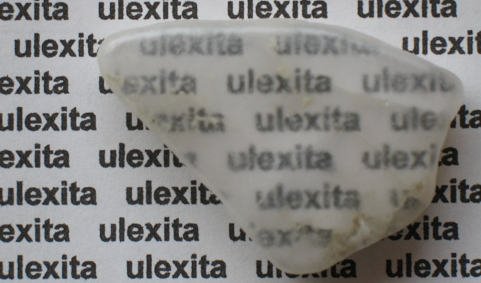
A fragment of ulexite

Economically important sources of boron are the minerals colemanite, rasorite (kernite), ulexite, and tincal. Together, these constitute 90% of mined boron-containing ore. The largest global borax deposits known, many still untapped, are in Central and Western Turkey, including the provinces of Eskişehir, Kütahya and Balıkesir. Global proven boron mineral mining reserves exceed one billion metric tonnes, against a yearly production of about four million tonnes.

Turkey and the United States are the largest producers of boron products. Turkey produces about half of the global yearly demand through Eti Mine Works (Turkish: Eti Maden İşletmeleri), a Turkish state-owned mining and chemicals company focusing on boron products. It holds a government monopoly on the mining of borate minerals in Turkey, which possesses 72% of the world's known deposits. In 2012, it held a 47% share of production of global borate minerals, ahead of its main competitor, Rio Tinto Group.

Almost a quarter (23%) of global boron production comes from the Rio Tinto Borax Mine (also known as the U.S. Borax Boron Mine) 35°2′34.447″N 117°40′45.412″W near Boron, California.

=== Market trend ===
The average cost of crystalline elemental boron was US$5/g in 2008. Elemental boron is chiefly used in making boron fibers, where it is deposited by chemical vapor deposition on a tungsten core (see below). Boron fibers are used in lightweight composite applications, such as high strength tapes. This use is a small fraction of total boron use. Boron is introduced into semiconductors as boron compounds by ion implantation.

Estimated global consumption of boron (almost entirely as boron compounds) was about 4 million tonnes of B_{2}O_{3} in 2012. The cost of boron compounds such as borax and kernite was cumulatively US$377/tonne in 2019.

Increasing demand for boric acid has led a number of producers to invest in additional capacity. Turkey's state-owned Eti Mine Works opened a new boric acid plant with the production capacity of 100,000 tonnes per year at Emet in 2003. Rio Tinto Group increased the capacity of its boron plant from 260,000 tonnes per year in 2003 to 310,000 tonnes per year by May 2005, with plans to grow this to 366,000 tonnes per year in 2006.

The rise in global demand has been driven by high growth rates in glass fiber, fiberglass, and borosilicate glassware production. A rapid increase in the manufacture of reinforcement-grade boron-containing fiberglass in Asia has offset the development of boron-free reinforcement-grade fiberglass in Europe and the US. The recent rises in energy prices may lead to greater use of insulation-grade fiberglass, with consequent growth in the boron consumption. Roskill Consulting Group forecasts that world demand for boron will grow by 3.4% per year to reach 21 million tonnes by 2010. The highest growth in demand is expected to be in Asia where demand could rise by an average 5.7% per year.

== Applications ==
Nearly all boron ore extracted from the Earth is refined as boric acid and sodium tetraborate pentahydrate. In the United States, 70% of the boron is used for the production of glass and ceramics. The major global industrial-scale use of boron compounds (about 46% of end-use) is in production of glass fiber for boron-containing insulating and structural fiberglasses, especially in Asia. Boron is added to the glass as borax pentahydrate or boron oxide to influence the strength or fluxing qualities of the glass fibers. Another 10% of global boron production is for borosilicate glass as used in high strength glassware. About 15% of global boron is used in boron ceramics, including super-hard materials discussed below. Agriculture consumes 11% of global boron production. Bleaches and detergents consume about 6%.

=== Boronated fiberglass ===
Fiberglasses, a fiber reinforced polymer, sometimes contains borosilicate, borax, or boron oxide that is added to increase the strength of the glass. The highly boronated glasses, E-glass (named for "Electrical" use), are alumino-borosilicate glass. Another common high-boron glass, C-glass, also has a high boron oxide content and is used for glass staple fibers and insulation. D-glass is a borosilicate glass named for its low dielectric constant.

Because of the ubiquitous use of fiberglass in construction and insulation, boron-containing fiberglasses consume over half the global production of boron and are the single largest commercial boron market.

=== Borosilicate glass ===
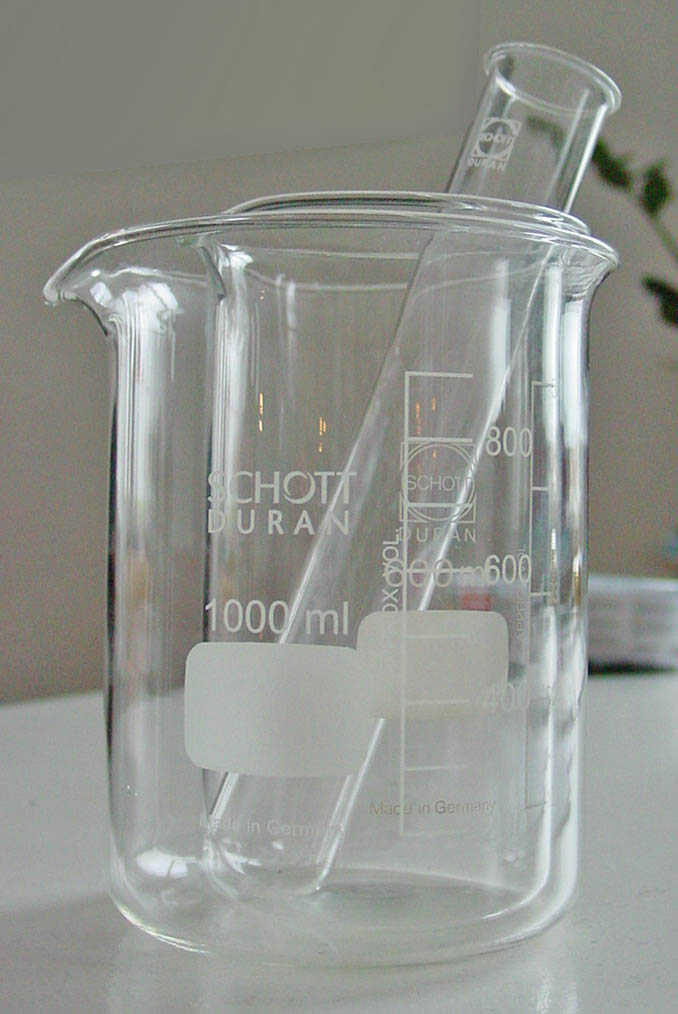
Borosilicate glassware. Displayed are two beakers and a test tube.

Borosilicate glass, which is typically 12–15% B_{2}O_{3}, 80% SiO_{2}, and 2% Al_{2}O_{3}, has a low coefficient of thermal expansion, giving it a good resistance to thermal shock. Schott AG's "Duran" and Owens-Corning's trademarked Pyrex are two major brand names for this glass, used both in laboratory glassware and in consumer cookware and bakeware, chiefly for this reason.

=== Elemental boron fiber ===
Boron fibers (boron filaments) are high-strength, lightweight materials that are used chiefly for advanced aerospace structures as a component of composite materials, as well as limited production consumer and sporting goods such as golf clubs and fishing rods. The fibers can be produced by chemical vapor deposition of boron on a tungsten filament.

Boron fibers and sub-millimeter sized crystalline boron springs are produced by laser-assisted chemical vapor deposition. Translation of the focused laser beam allows production of complex helical structures. Such structures show good mechanical properties (elastic modulus 450 GPa, fracture strain 3.7%, fracture stress 17 GPa) and can be applied as reinforcement of ceramics or in micromechanical systems.

=== Boron carbide ceramic ===
Boron carbide's ability to absorb neutrons without forming long-lived radionuclides (especially when doped with extra boron-10) makes the material attractive as an absorbent for neutron radiation arising in nuclear power plants. Nuclear applications of boron carbide include shielding, control rods, and shut-down pellets. Within control rods, boron carbide is often powdered to increase its surface area.

=== High-hardness and abrasive compounds ===
Mechanical properties of BCN solids and ReB_{2}
Material	Vickers hardness (GPa)	Fracture toughness (MPa⋅m^{1/2})
Diamond	115	5.3
cubic-BC_{2}N	76	4.5
cubic-BC_{5}	71	9.5
cubic-BN	62	6.8
B_{4}C	38	22
ReB_{2}	3.5	

Boron carbide and cubic boron nitride powders are widely used as abrasives. Boron nitride is a material isoelectronic to carbon. Similar to carbon, it has both hexagonal (soft graphite-like h-BN) and cubic (hard, diamond-like c-BN) forms. h-BN is used as a high temperature component and lubricant. c-BN, also known under commercial name borazon, is a superior abrasive. Its hardness is only slightly less than that of diamond, while its chemical stability is greater. Heterodiamond (also called BCN) is another diamond-like boron compound.

=== Metallurgy ===
Boron is added to boron steels at the level of a few parts per million to increase hardenability. Higher percentages are added to steels used in the nuclear industry due to boron's neutron absorption ability.

Boron can also increase the surface hardness of steels and alloys through boriding. Additionally metal borides are used for coating tools through chemical vapor deposition or physical vapor deposition. Implantation of boron ions into metals and alloys, through ion implantation or ion beam deposition, results in a spectacular increase in surface resistance and microhardness. Laser alloying has also been used successfully for the same purpose. These borides are an alternative to diamond coated tools, and their surfaces have similar properties to those of the bulk boride.

For example, rhenium diboride can be produced at ambient pressures but is rather expensive because of the cost of rhenium. The hardness of ReB_{2} exhibits considerable anisotropy because of its hexagonal layered structure. Its value is comparable to that of tungsten carbide, silicon carbide, titanium diboride, or zirconium diboride. Similarly, AlMgB_{14} + TiB_{2} composites possess high hardness and wear resistance and are used in either bulk form or as coatings for components exposed to high temperatures and wear loads.

=== Detergent formulations and bleaching agents ===
Borax is used in various household laundry and cleaning products. It is also present in some tooth bleaching formulas.

Sodium perborate is a source of active oxygen in many detergents, laundry detergents, cleaning products, and laundry bleaches. However, despite its name, "Borateem" laundry bleach no longer contains any boron compounds, using sodium percarbonate instead as a bleaching agent.

=== Insecticides and antifungals ===
Zinc borates and boric acid, popularized as fire retardants, are widely used as wood preservatives and insecticides. Boric acid is also used as a domestic insecticide.

=== Semiconductors ===
Boron is a useful dopant for such semiconductors as silicon, germanium, and silicon carbide. Having one fewer valence electron than the host atom, it donates a hole, resulting in p-type conductivity. The traditional method of doping semiconductors with boron is via atomic diffusion at high temperatures. This process uses either solid (B_{2}O_{3}), liquid (BBr_{3}), or gaseous boron sources (B_{2}H_{6} or BF_{3}). However, after the 1970s, it was mostly replaced by ion implantation, which relies mostly on BF_{3} as a boron source. Boron trichloride gas is also an important chemical in the semiconductor industry for the plasma etching of metals and their oxides. Triethylborane is also injected into vapor deposition reactors as a boron source. Examples are the plasma deposition of boron-containing hard carbon films, silicon nitride–boron nitride films, and the doping of diamond film with boron.

=== Magnets ===
Boron is a component of neodymium magnets (Nd_{2}Fe_{14}B), which are among the strongest type of permanent magnet. These magnets are found in a variety of electromechanical and electronic devices such as in magnetic resonance imaging (MRI) medical imaging systems and in compact and relatively small motors and actuators. As examples, computer hard disk drive, CD, and DVD players rely on neodymium magnet motors to deliver intense rotary power in a compact package. In mobile phones, "Neo" magnets provide the magnetic field which allows tiny speakers to deliver appreciable audio power.

=== Shielding and neutron absorber in nuclear reactors ===
Boron shielding is used as a control for nuclear reactors, taking advantage of its high cross-section for neutron capture.

In pressurized water reactors, a variable concentration of boronic acid in the cooling water is used as a neutron poison to compensate the variable reactivity of the fuel. When new rods are inserted, the concentration of boronic acid is maximal. It then is reduced during its lifetime.

=== Other nonmedical uses ===
Launch of Apollo 15 Saturn V rocket, using triethylborane ignitor

- Because of its distinctive green flame, amorphous boron is used in pyrotechnic flares.
- Some anti-corrosion systems contain borax.
- Sodium borates are used as a flux for soldering silver and gold and with ammonium chloride for welding ferrous metals. They are also fire retarding additives to plastics and rubber articles.
- Boric acid (also known as orthoboric acid) H_{3}BO_{3} is used in the production of textile fiberglass and flat panel displays and in many PVAc- and PVOH-based adhesives.
- Triethylborane is a substance which ignites the JP-7 fuel of the Pratt & Whitney J58 turbojet/ramjet engines powering the Lockheed SR-71 Blackbird. It was also used to ignite the F-1 Engines on the Saturn V Rocket used by NASA's Apollo and Skylab programs from 1967 until 1973. Today, SpaceX uses it to ignite the engines on their Falcon 9 rocket. Triethylborane is suitable for this because of its pyrophoric properties, especially the fact that it burns with a high temperature. Triethylborane is an industrial initiator in radical reactions, where it is effective even at low temperatures.
- Borates are used as environmentally benign wood preservatives.

=== Pharmaceutical and biological applications ===
Boron plays a role in pharmaceutical and biological applications as it is found in various antibiotics produced by bacteria, such as boromycins, aplasmomycins, borophycins, and tartrolons. These antibiotics have shown inhibitory effects on the growth of certain bacteria, fungi, and protozoa. Boron is also being studied for its potential medicinal applications, including its incorporation into biologically active molecules for therapies like boron neutron capture therapy for brain tumors. Some boron-containing biomolecules may act as signaling molecules interacting with cell surfaces, suggesting a role in cellular communication.

Boric acid and its salts, known as borates, are widely used in cleaners and fertilizers. Boric acid is a major component of some skin treatments; however, dermal exposure to high concentrations of boron can lead to severe adverse health effects including death, particularly when the skin is damaged. Consumption of boric acid can also lead to abdominal pain, vomiting, and diarrhea. The chemical is absorbed by the gastrointestinal system. Mild solutions of boric acid have been used as eye antiseptics.

Boron appears as an active element in the organic pharmaceutical bortezomib, a class of drug called the proteasome inhibitor, for treating myeloma and one form of lymphoma. The boron atom in bortezomib binds the catalytic site of the 26S proteasome.

- A number of potential boronated pharmaceuticals using boron-10 have been prepared for use in boron neutron capture therapy (BNCT).
- Some boron compounds show promise in treating arthritis, though none have as yet been generally approved for the purpose.

Tavaborole is an aminoacyl tRNA synthetase inhibitor which is used to treat toenail fungus. It gained FDA approval in July 2014.

Dioxaborolane chemistry enables radioactive fluoride (^{18}F) labeling of antibodies or red blood cells, which allows for positron emission tomography (PET) imaging of cancer and hemorrhages, respectively. A Human-Derived, Genetic, Positron-emitting and Fluorescent (HD-GPF) reporter system uses a human protein, PSMA and non-immunogenic, and a small molecule that is positron-emitting (boron bound ^{18}F) and fluorescence for dual modality PET and fluorescent imaging of genome modified cells, e.g. cancer, CRISPR/Cas9, or CAR T-cells, in an entire mouse. The dual-modality small molecule targeting PSMA was tested in humans and found the location of primary and metastatic prostate cancer, aided the fluorescence-guided removal of cancer, and detected single cancer cells in tissue margins.

== Research ==
=== MgB_{2} ===
Magnesium diboride (MgB_{2}) is a superconductor with a transition temperature of 39 K. MgB_{2} wires are produced with the powder-in-tube process and applied in superconducting magnets. A project at CERN to make MgB_{2} cables has resulted in superconducting test cables able to carry 20,000 amperes for extremely high current distribution applications, such as the contemplated high luminosity version of the Large Hadron Collider.

=== Commercial isotope enrichment ===
Because of its high neutron cross-section, boron-10 is often used to control fission in nuclear reactors as a neutron-capturing substance. Several industrial-scale enrichment processes have been developed; however, only the fractionated vacuum distillation of the dimethyl ether adduct of boron trifluoride (DME-BF_{3}) and column chromatography of borates are being used.

=== Radiation-hardened semiconductors ===
Cosmic radiation produces secondary neutrons when it hits spacecraft structures. Those neutrons are captured in ^{10}B if it is present in the spacecraft's semiconductors, producing a gamma ray, an alpha particle, and a lithium ion. Those resultant decay products may then irradiate nearby semiconductor "chip" structures, causing data loss (bit flipping, or single event upset). In radiation-hardened semiconductor designs, one countermeasure is to use depleted boron, which is greatly enriched in ^{11}B and contains almost no ^{10}B. This is useful because ^{11}B is largely immune to radiation damage. Depleted boron is a byproduct of the nuclear industry (see above).

=== Proton–boron fusion ===
^{11}B is also a candidate as a fuel for aneutronic fusion. When struck by a proton with energy of about 500 keV, it produces three alpha particles and 8.7 MeV of energy. Most other fusion reactions involving hydrogen and helium produce penetrating neutron radiation, which weakens reactor structures and induces long-term radioactivity, thereby endangering operating personnel. The alpha particles from ^{11}B fusion can be turned directly into electric power, and all radiation stops as soon as the reactor is turned off.

=== Enriched boron (boron-10) ===
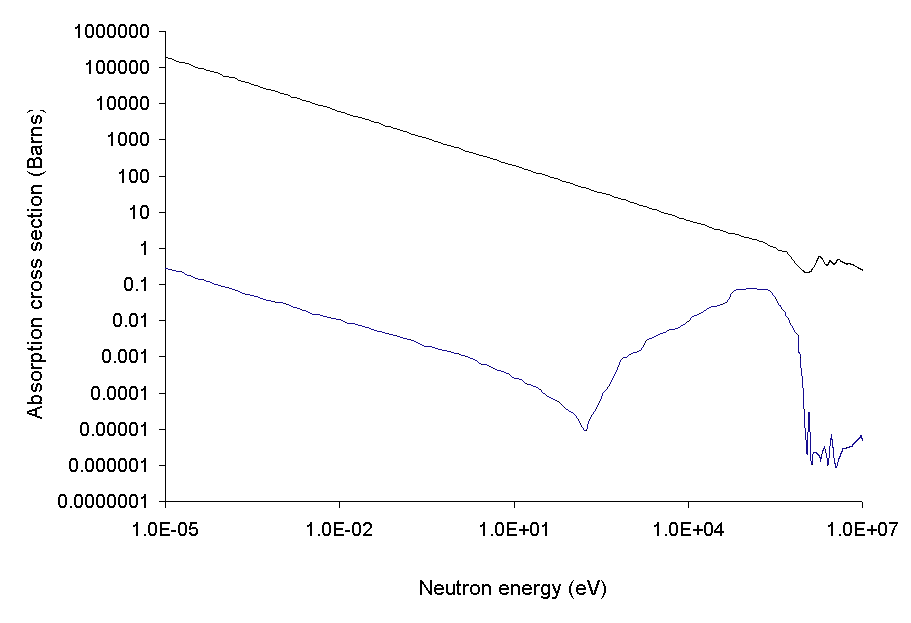
Neutron cross section of boron (top curve is for ^{10}B and bottom curve for ^{11}B)

The ^{10}B isotope is useful for capturing thermal neutrons (see neutron cross section). The nuclear industry enriches natural boron to nearly pure ^{10}B. The less valuable by-product, depleted boron, is nearly pure ^{11}B.

Enriched boron or ^{10}B is both used in radiation shielding and is the primary nuclide used in neutron capture therapy of cancer. In the latter ("boron neutron capture therapy" or BNCT), a compound containing ^{10}B is incorporated into a pharmaceutical which is selectively taken up by a malignant tumor and tissues near it. The patient is then treated with a beam of low energy neutrons at a relatively low neutron radiation dose. The neutrons trigger energetic and short-range secondary alpha particle and lithium-7 heavy ion radiation that are products of the boron-neutron nuclear reaction, and this ion radiation additionally bombards the tumor, especially from inside the tumor cells.

In nuclear reactors, ^{10}B is used for reactivity control and in emergency shutdown systems. It can serve either function in the form of borosilicate control rods or as boric acid. In pressurized water reactors, ^{10}B boric acid is added to the reactor coolant after the plant is shut down for refueling. When the plant is started up again, the boric acid is slowly filtered out over many months as fissile material is used up and the fuel becomes less reactive.

=== Nuclear fusion ===
Boron has been investigated for possible applications in nuclear fusion research. It is commonly used for conditioning the walls in fusion reactors by depositing boron coatings on plasma-facing components and walls to reduce the release of hydrogen and impurities from the surfaces. It is also being used for the dissipation of energy in the fusion plasma boundary to suppress excessive energy bursts and heat fluxes to the walls.

=== Neutron capture therapy ===
In neutron capture therapy (NCT) for malignant brain tumors, boron is researched to be used for selectively targeting and destroying tumor cells. The goal is to deliver higher concentrations of the non-radioactive boron isotope (^{10}B) to the tumor cells than to the surrounding normal tissues. When these ^{10}B-containing cells are irradiated with low-energy thermal neutrons, they undergo nuclear capture reactions, releasing high linear energy transfer (LET) particles such as alpha particles and lithium-7 nuclei within a limited path length. These high-LET particles can destroy the adjacent tumor cells without causing significant harm to nearby normal cells. Boron acts as a selective agent due to its ability to absorb thermal neutrons and produce short-range physical effects primarily affecting the targeted tissue region. This binary approach allows for precise tumor cell killing while sparing healthy tissues. The effective delivery of boron involves administering boron compounds or carriers capable of accumulating selectively in tumor cells compared to surrounding tissue. BSH and BPA have been used clinically, but research continues to identify more optimal carriers. Accelerator-based neutron sources have also been developed recently as an alternative to reactor-based sources, leading to improved efficiency and enhanced clinical outcomes in NCT. By employing the properties of boron isotopes and targeted irradiation techniques, NCT offers a potential approach to treating malignant brain tumors by selectively killing cancer cells while minimizing the damage caused by traditional radiation therapies.

BNCT has shown promising results in clinical trials for various other malignancies, including glioblastoma, head and neck cancer, cutaneous melanoma, hepatocellular carcinoma, lung cancer, and extramammary Paget's disease. The treatment involves a nuclear reaction between nonradioactive boron-10 isotope and low-energy thermal or high-energy epithermal neutrons to generate α particles and lithium nuclei that selectively destroy DNA in tumor cells. The primary challenge lies in developing efficient boron agents with higher content and specific targeting properties tailored for NCT. Integration of tumor-targeting strategies with NCT could potentially establish it as a practical personalized treatment option for different types of cancers. Ongoing research explores new boron compounds, optimization strategies, theranostic agents, and radiobiological advances to overcome limitations and cost-effectively improve patient outcomes.

== Biological role ==
Boron is an essential plant nutrient, required primarily for maintaining the integrity of cell walls. However, high soil concentrations of greater than 1.0 ppm lead to marginal and tip necrosis in leaves as well as poor overall growth performance. Levels as low as 0.8 ppm produce these same symptoms in plants that are particularly sensitive to boron in the soil. Nearly all plants, even those somewhat tolerant of soil boron, will show at least some symptoms of boron toxicity when soil boron content is greater than 1.8 ppm. When this content exceeds 2.0 ppm, few plants will perform well and some may not survive.

Some boron-containing antibiotics exist in nature. The first one found was boromycin, isolated from streptomyces in the 1960s. Others are tartrolons, a group of antibiotics discovered in the 1990s from culture broth of the myxobacterium-group Sorangium cellulosum.

In 2013, chemist and synthetic biologist Steve Benner suggested that the conditions on Mars three billion years ago were much more favorable to the stability of RNA and formation of oxygen-containing (Note: The Earth's atmosphere and prehistoric oceans three billion years ago had much lower oxygen levels than Earth's modern climate.) boron and molybdenum catalysts found in life. According to Benner's theory, primitive life, which is widely believed to have originated from RNA, first formed on Mars before migrating to Earth.

=== In human health ===
Boron may have several essential roles in animals, including humans, but its exact physiological role is poorly understood. Boron deficiency has only been clearly established in livestock. In humans, boron deficiency may affect bone mineral density, though it has been noted that additional research on the effects of bone health is necessary.

Boron is not classified as an essential human nutrient because research has not established a clear biological function for it. The U.S. Food and Nutrition Board (FNB) found the existing data insufficient to derive a Recommended Dietary Allowance (RDA), Adequate Intake (AI), or Estimated Average Requirement (EAR) for boron and the U.S. Food and Drug Administration (FDA) has not established a daily value for boron for food and dietary supplement labeling purposes. While low boron levels can be detrimental to health, with studies suggesting that they increase the risks of osteoporosis, poor immune function, and cognitive decline, high boron levels are associated with cell damage and toxicity.

Still, studies suggest that boron may exert beneficial effects on reproduction and development, calcium metabolism, bone formation, brain function, insulin and energy substrate metabolism, immunity, and steroid hormone (including estrogen), and vitamin D function, among other functions. In a small human trial published in 1987, investigators reported on postmenopausal women first made boron deficient and then repleted with 3 mg/day, boron supplementation markedly reduced urinary calcium excretion and elevated the serum concentrations of 17 β-estradiol and testosterone. Environmental boron appears to be inversely correlated with arthritis.

The exact mechanism by which boron exerts its physiological effects is not fully understood but may involve interactions with adenosine monophosphate (ADP) and S-adenosyl methionine (SAM-e), two compounds involved in important cellular functions. Furthermore, boron appears to inhibit cyclic ADP-ribose, thereby affecting the release of calcium ions from the endoplasmic reticulum and affecting various biological processes. Some studies suggest that boron may reduce levels of inflammatory biomarkers. Congenital endothelial dystrophy type 2, a rare form of corneal dystrophy, is linked to mutations in SLC4A11 gene that encodes a transporter reportedly regulating the intracellular concentration of boron.

In humans, boron is usually consumed with food that contains boron, such as fruits, leafy vegetables, and nuts. Foods that are particularly rich in boron include avocados, dried fruits such as raisins, peanuts, pecans, prune juice, grape juice, wine and chocolate powder. According to 2-day food records from the respondents to the Third National Health and Nutrition Examination Survey (NHANES III), adult dietary intake was recorded at 0.9 to 1.4 mg/day.

=== Health issues and toxicity ===
Boron
Hazards
- GHS labelling
Pictograms	(GHS07: Exclamation mark)
Signal word	Warning
Hazard statements	H302, H412
Precautionary statements	P264, P270, P273, P301+P312, P501
NFPA 704 (fire diamond)	1 0 0

Elemental boron, boron oxide, boric acid, borate, and many organoboron compounds are relatively nontoxic to humans and animals (with toxicity similar to that of table salt). The LD_{50} (dose at which there is 50% mortality) for animals is about 6 g per kg of body weight. Substances with an LD_{50} above 2 g/kg are considered nontoxic. An intake of 4 g/day of boric acid was reported without incident, but more than this is considered toxic in more than a few doses. Intakes of more than 0.5 grams per day for 50 days cause minor digestive and other problems suggestive of toxicity.

Boric acid is more toxic to insects than to mammals, and is routinely used as an insecticide. However, it has been used in neutron capture therapy alongside other boron compounds such as sodium borocaptate and boronophenylalanine with reported low toxicity levels.

The boranes (boron hydrogen compounds) and similar gaseous compounds are quite poisonous. As usual, boron is not an element that is intrinsically poisonous, but the toxicity of these compounds depends on structure (for another example of this phenomenon, see phosphine). The boranes are also highly flammable and require special care when handling. Some combinations of boranes and other compounds are highly explosive. Sodium borohydride presents a fire hazard owing to its reducing nature and the liberation of hydrogen on contact with acid. Boron halides are corrosive.

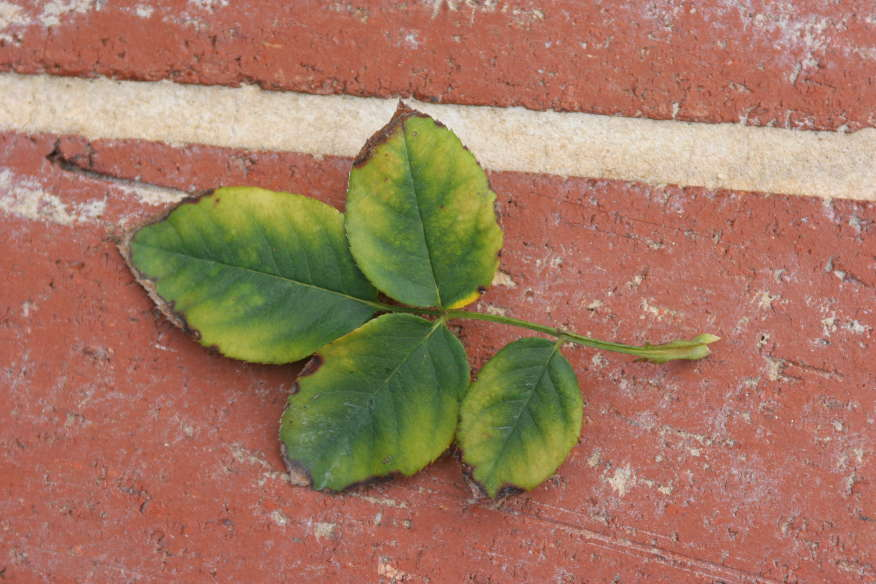
Boron toxicity in rose leaves

Boron is necessary for plant growth, but an excess of boron is toxic to plants, and occurs particularly in acidic soil. It presents as a yellowing from the tip inwards of the oldest leaves and black spots in barley leaves, but it can be confused with other stresses such as magnesium deficiency in other plants.

== See also ==
- Allotropes of boron
- Boron deficiency
- Boron oxide
- Boron nitride
- Boron neutron capture therapy
- Boronic acid
- Boronization
- Hydroboration-oxidation reaction
- Suzuki coupling
