= Susan Allen =

Susan Allen may refer to:

- Susan Allen (politician) (born 1963), American politician, member of the Minnesota House of Representatives
- Susan Allen (musician) (1951–2015), American harpist and music educator
- Susan D. Allen (born 1943), American engineering professor and academic administrator
- Susan Brown Allen (born 1964), American author, political consultant, and first lady of Virginia
- Susan E. Cannon Allen (1859–1935), African-American suffragist and temperance activist

== See also ==
- Sue Allen (born 1947), American politician, member of the Missouri House of Representatives
