= Pentaborane =

Pentaborane may refer to:

- Pentaborane(9) (B_{5}H_{9})
- Pentaborane(11) (B_{5}H_{11})
