= R56 =

R56 may refer to:

== Roads ==
- R56 (South Africa)
- D56 motorway in the Czech Republic, formerly R56 expressway

== Other uses ==
- R-56 (rocket), a Soviet rocket design
- HMS Tuscan (R56) a destroyer of the Royal Navy
- Mini Hatch (R56), a car
- R-56 Nordholz, a former airfield of the United States Army Air Corps in Germany
- R56: Toxic to soil organisms, a risk phrase
