= Arcangiolo Birelli =

Italian painter (1859–1928)

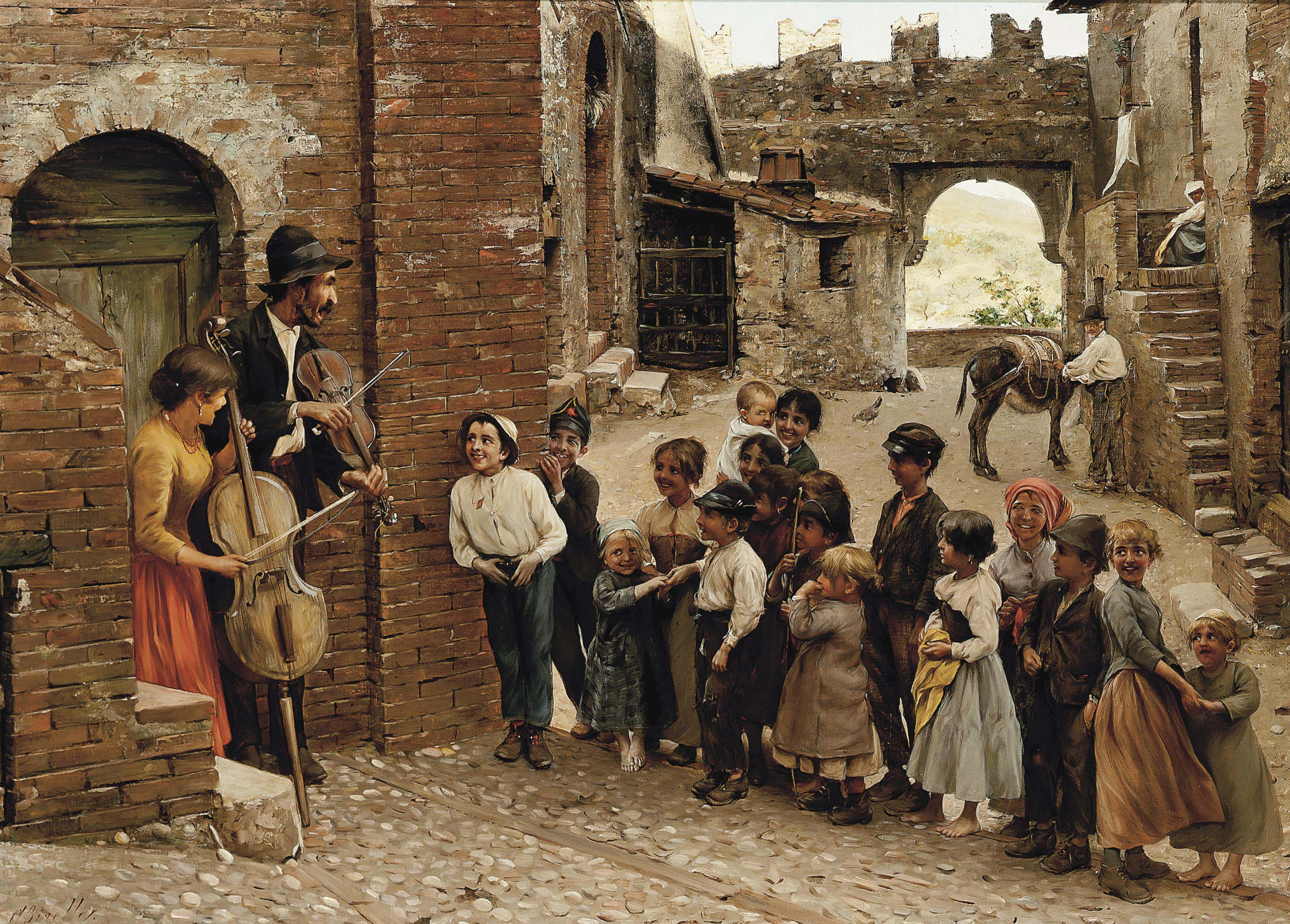
- Arcangiolo Birelli: A captive audience (c. 1890). Private collection.
- Born: 1859; Castelnuovo di Val di Cecina
- Died: 1928 (aged 68–69); Terni
- Notable work: La conversione dell'Innominato (c. 1881)

Arcangiolo Birelli (1859–1928) was an Italian painter.

== Biography ==
Birelli was born in Castelnuovo di Val di Cecina in 1859. Educated in Tuscany, he was active in Florence during the 1880s and 1890s. In this period he painted his best‑known work La conversione dell'innominato (c. 1881, Lecco, Villa Manzoni) and A captive audience (c. 1890 circa, private collection).

Between 1891 and 1894 he exhibited at the Münchener Jahresausstellung and also in San Francisco, California.

At the beginning of the 20th century, a long illness slowed and eventually ended his artistic career. He died in Terni in 1928.

== Works (selection) ==
- Religious conversion of the Unnamed (c. 1881), oil on canvas. Lecco, Villa Manzoni;
- Studienköpfe (c. 1888). Unknown location;
- A captive audience (c. 1890), oil on canvas. Private collection;
- Alte Frau (c. 1891). Unknown location;
- Der Balladensänger (c. 1893). Unknown location;
- Lebhafte Unterhaltung (c. 1894). Unknown location;
- Carriage in the courtyard of an Italian palace (not dated), oil on canvas. Private collection;
- Ornamenti al tempio (not dated), oil on canvas. Private collection.
