= Boron deficiency =

Boron deficiency may refer to:

- Boron deficiency (plant disorder), a nutritional disorder in plants
- Boron deficiency (medicine), a nutritional disorder in animals
