= RD-270 =

Large Soviet rocket engine that used hypergolic propellants

RD-270 (РД-270)
- Country of origin: Soviet Union; Russia
- Date: 1962–1968
- Designer: V. Glushko, USSR/Ukrainian Soviet Socialist Republic
- Manufacturer: Energomash
- Application: Glushko's answer to the US Rocketdyne F-1
- Successor: RD-270M
- Status: Development cancelled in 1968

Liquid-fuel engine
- Propellant: N_{2}O_{4} / UDMH
- Cycle: Full-flow staged combustion

Performance
- Thrust, vacuum: 6,713 kN (1,509,000 lb_{f})
- Thrust, sea-level: 6,270 kN (1,410,000 lb_{f})
- Thrust-to-weight ratio: 189.91
- Chamber pressure: 26.1 MPa (3,790 psi)
- Specific impulse, vacuum: 322 s (3.16 km/s)
- Specific impulse, sea-level: 301 s (2.95 km/s)

Dimensions
- Length: 194 in (4,900 mm)
- Diameter: 132 in (3,400 mm)
- Dry mass: 3,370 kg (7,430 lb)

Used in
- 1st stage of proposed UR-700 and UR-900

RD-270 (Russian: Ракетный Двигатель-270, romanized: Raketnyy Dvigatel-270, lit. 'Rocket Engine 270', GRAU index: 8D420) was a single-chamber liquid-fuel rocket engine designed by Energomash (USSR) in 1960–1970. It was to be used on the first stages of the proposed heavy-lift UR-700 and UR-900 rocket families, as well as on the N1. It has the highest thrust among single-chamber engines of the USSR, 640 metric tons at the surface of Earth. The propellants used are a hypergolic mixture of unsymmetrical dimethylhydrazine (UDMH) fuel with dinitrogen tetroxide (N_{2}O_{4}) oxidizer. The chamber pressure was among the highest considered, being about 26 MPa. This was achieved by applying the full-flow staged combustion cycle for all the incoming mass of fuel, which is turned into a gas and passes through multiple turbines before being burned in the combustion chamber. This allowed the engine to achieve a specific impulse of 301 s (2.95 km/s) at sea level.

Engine testing was underway when the decision was made to cancel the program. Development was stopped with all other work on corresponding rocket projects on 11 December 1970.

== History ==
The development of the RD-270 started on 26 June 1962. Preliminary investigations and development of the engine and its further production were performed under the guidance of Valentin Glushko and finished in 1967. It became the most powerful engine in the world to date that used storable propellants. During 1967–1969, several test firings were performed with experimental engines that were adapted to work at sea level and had a short nozzle. In total, 27 test firings were performed with 22 engines; three engines were tested twice, and one of them was tested three times.

The RD 270 was also considered for the R-56 rocket (although never formally adopted) until work on the design stopped in June 1964.

During development, Glushko studied the use of pentaborane "zip" propellants in a modified RD-270M engine. This would have created immense toxicity problems but increased the specific impulse of the engine by 42 seconds (0.41 km/s).

== Design ==
The engine throttle range was 95–105%, the thrust vector control range was ±12° (project R-56) and ±8° for UR-700 rocket family. The oxidizer-to-fuel ratio was 2.67 and could be changed by up to 7%.

To achieve such a high specific impulse and pressure in combustion chamber as RD-270 has, two circuits of full-flow staged combustion cycle were applied. The pair of turbines with preburners turns the fuel into the gaseous form and circulates all of the fuel components. One of the turbines uses the fuel-rich gas to power a fuel pump, another one uses the oxidizer-rich gas to power the oxidizer pump. As a result, the main combustion chamber burns only generator gas. The engine controller regulates the functions of the two independent fuel and oxidizer circuits.

To cool the MCC, its wall structure is layered, with four internal belts of slots. Some parts of the nozzle are covered by zirconium dioxide for thermal protection.

== See also ==
- Rocket engine
- Staged combustion cycle
- RD-253 engine for "Universal Rocket" family.
- RD-170 - comparable Russian RP-1/LOX engine with four combustion chambers.
- F-1 - comparable RP-1/LOX engine.
- Raptor - comparable methane engine.
- Proton rocket - successor of one of universal rocket series.
- N1 ("Carrier #1") - alternative rocket for Soviet lunar projects.
