= Susan D. Allen =

US scientist and professor

Susan Davis Allen
- Born: 1943 (age 82–83)
- Education: Colorado College (BS); University of Southern California (PhD)
- Scientific career
- Fields: Physics; Optics; Lasers; Materials; Chemistry
- Institutions: Embry–Riddle Aeronautical University
- Thesis: The circular dichroism of an optically active benzene chromophore (1971)

Susan Davis Allen (born 1943) is an American engineering professor and academic administrator. She is currently Associate Dean of Research for the College of Engineering and Distinguished Professor of Mechanical Engineering at Embry-Riddle Aeronautical University. Her research has spanned multiple applications of lasers and optics, including spectroscopy, laser sensors, laser ablation, micromachining, and others.

She is a fellow of the National Academy of Inventors, a fellow of SPIE, a senior member of IEEE, an emeritus member of the Optical Society, and a past director of the American Vacuum Society. She has published over 170 research articles and has received ten patents.

== Professional career ==
Allen received a Bachelor of Science degree in chemistry from Colorado College in 1966 and a PhD in chemical physics from the University of Southern California in 1971. She worked as a member of the technical staff at Hughes Research Laboratories beginning in 1973 but returned to USC in 1977, serving as a research scientist and research professor. In 1987, she became a professor of chemistry and electrical and computer engineering at the Center for Laser Science and Engineering at the University of Iowa, where she worked for five years until being named dean of the graduate school at Tulane University in 1992, as well as vice president for research and professor of chemistry, electrical engineering, and computer science. She left Tulane in 1996 to become professor of chemistry at Florida State University, where she also held a joint appointment as professor of electrical and computer engineering at the Florida A&M University – Florida State University College of Engineering. From 1996 to 1999, she also served as vice president for research at FSU.

In November 2002, Allen was appointed Vice Chancellor for Research and Academic Affairs at Arkansas State University, functioning as the chief academic officer. She also held a joint appointment to the faculty at the University of Arkansas for Medical Sciences. She served a five-year term in that role, then returned to full-time research in 2007 as distinguished professor of laser applications and science in the faculty of chemistry, physics, and engineering, serving as director of the Arkansas Center for Laser Applications and Science. In 2012, she moved to her current position as Associate Dean of Research for the Daytona College of Engineering at Embry-Riddle Aeronautical University, where she also serves as Distinguished Professor of Mechanical Engineering.

=== Research ===
Allen's work spans many disciplines, centering primarily around how laser light interacts with matter. Her PhD dissertation research used circularly polarized light, specifically circular dichroism, to investigate electronic transitions in benzene. Early career research included collaborations with Elsa Garmire and John Marburger on the study of bistable optical devices, which could be used for various forms of optical signal processing. While at the University of Southern California, she published a number of papers on laser chemical vapor deposition. Subsequent research covered a variety of laser interactions with surfaces, including laser drilling and machining, laser-assisted desorption and particle removal, and laser ablation. Recent work has covered the use of picosecond pulsed lasers in a variety of fundamental physics, chemistry, and spectroscopy studies and potential applications.

== Board and organization membership ==
Allen has served on multiple advisory boards, committees, and review panels throughout her career. She has served on multiple committees and advisory boards to the National Science Foundation, the Naval Studies Board of the National Academy of Sciences, and the board of directors of the Oak Ridge Associated Universities. She served in the leadership of the Association of Graduate Schools in the Association of American Universities and on several committees in the National Association of State Universities and Land Grant Colleges (NASULGC), now known as the Association of Public and Land-grant Universities (APLU). She is a member of the International Women's Forum.

Allen is active in a number of scientific and engineering professional societies. She is a fellow of SPIE, a senior member of IEEE, an emeritus member of The Optical Society, and a past director of the American Vacuum Society. She is active in the Materials Research Society, Sigma Xi, the American Association of University Women, the Society of Women Engineers, the American Society for Engineering Education, the American Chemical Society, the American Physical Society, the American Institute of Aeronautics and Astronautics, and several other societies and organizations.

== Awards and honors ==
- President's Committee for the National Medal of Science, 2007-2009
- Fellow, SPIE, 2010
- Fellow, National Academy of Inventors, 2019
