= Sasso Pisano =

- Frazione
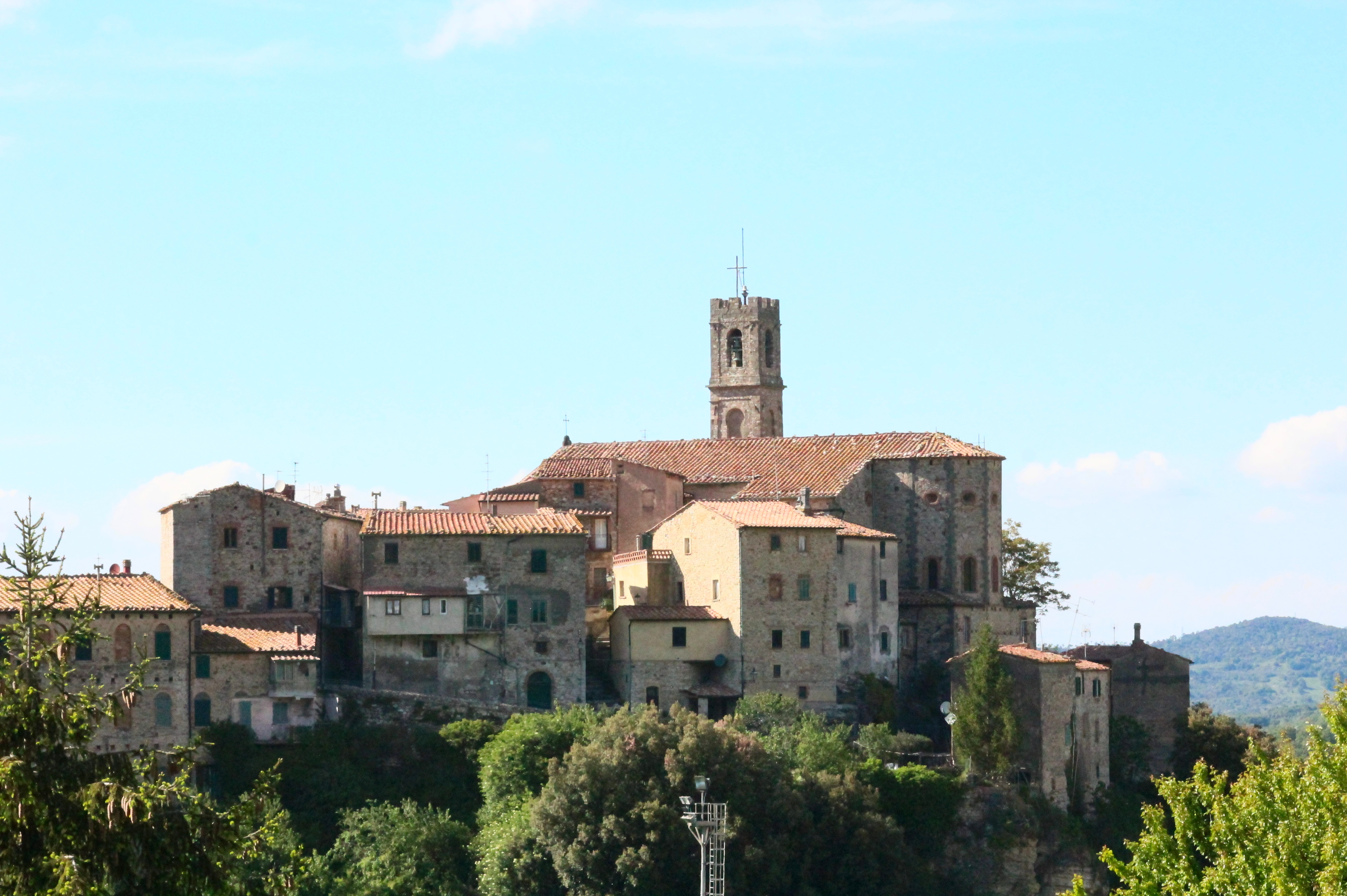

- Location of Sasso Pisano in Italy
- Coordinates: 43°10′2″N 10°51′51″E
- Country: Italy
- Region: Tuscany
- Province: Pisa (PI)
- Comune: Castelnuovo di Val di Cecina
- Elevation: 487 m (1,598 ft)

Population (2011)
  - Total: 203
- Demonym: Sasserini
- Time zone: UTC+1 (CET)
  - Summer (DST): UTC+2 (CEST)
- Postal code: 56041
- Dialing code: (+39) 0588

Sasso Pisano is a village in Tuscany, central Italy, administratively a frazione of the comune of Castelnuovo di Val di Cecina, province of Pisa. At the time of the 2001 census its population was 213.

Sasso Pisano is about 102 km from Pisa and 9 km from Castelnuovo di Val di Cecina.

The museum contains finds from the Etruscan era in the area and especially the Etruscan baths nearby.

The mineral sassolite was named after Sasso Pisano. It was found in lagoons throughout Tuscany and Sasso and was the main source of European borax from 1827 to 1872, when American sources replaced it.
