= Montecastelli Pisano =

- Frazione
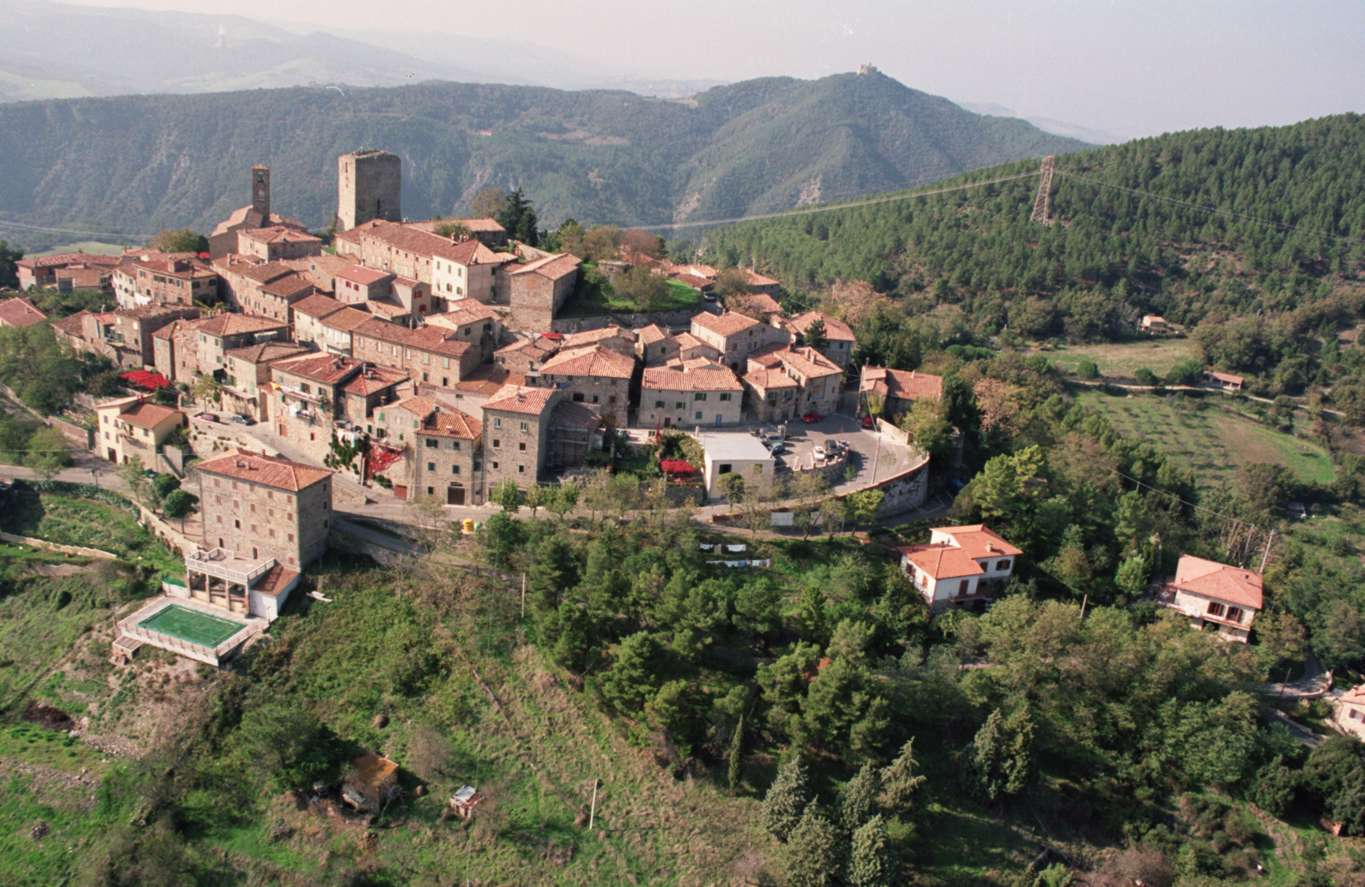

- Location of Montecastelli Pisano in Italy
- Coordinates: 43°15′55″N 10°57′28″E
- Country: Italy
- Region: Tuscany
- Province: Pisa (PI)
- Comune: Castelnuovo di Val di Cecina
- Elevation: 485 m (1,591 ft)

Population (2011)
  - Total: 114
- Demonym: Montecastellini
- Time zone: UTC+1 (CET)
  - Summer (DST): UTC+2 (CEST)
- Postal code: 56041
- Dialing code: (+39) 0588

Montecastelli Pisano is a village in Tuscany, central Italy, administratively a frazione of the comune of Castelnuovo di Val di Cecina, province of Pisa. At the time of the 2001 census its population was 188.

Montecastelli Pisano is about 90 km (56 mi) from Pisa and 13 km (8.1 mi) from Castelnuovo di Val di Cecina.
