= Sassolite =

Mineral form of boric acid

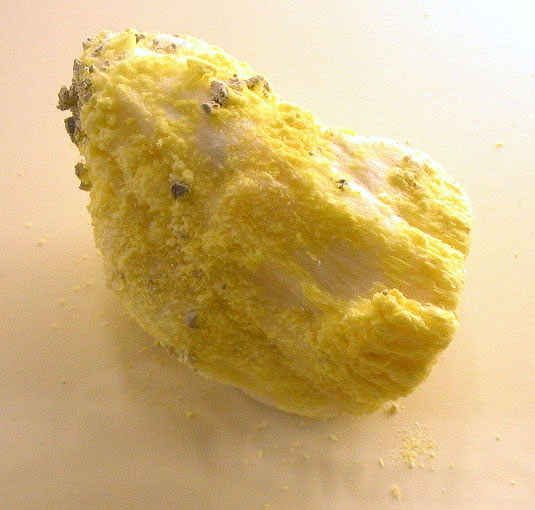
- Yellow sassolite

General
- Category: Borate mineral
- Formula: H_{3}BO_{3}
- IMA symbol: Sso
- Strunz classification: 6.AA.05
- Crystal system: Triclinic
- Crystal class: Pinacoidal (1̅) (same H-M symbol)
- Space group: P1̅
- Unit cell: a = 7.02 Å, b = 7.06 Å c = 6.59 Å; α = 103.65° β = 101.11°, γ = 59.98°; Z = 4

Identification
- Colour: White to gray, may be pale yellow from included sulfur or pale brown from included iron oxides; colourless in transmitted light
- Crystal habit: As scaly pseudohexagonal crystals; ncrustations; platy; tabular; may be stalactitic
- Twinning: Around [001] as twin axis, common
- Cleavage: Perfect on {001}, micaceous
- Tenacity: Sectile
- Mohs scale hardness: 1
- Lustre: Vitreous to pearly
- Streak: White
- Diaphaneity: Transparent
- Specific gravity: 1.46–1.50
- Density: 1.46-1.50 g/cm^{3}
- Optical properties: Biaxial (−)
- Refractive index: n_{α} = 1.340 n_{β} = 1.456 n_{γ} = 1.459
- Birefringence: δ = 0.119
- 2V angle: Measured: 5°, Calculated: 16°
- Solubility: Soluble in water

Sassolite is a borate mineral, specifically the mineral form of boric acid. It is usually white to gray, and colourless in transmitted light. It can also take on a yellow colour from sulfur impurities, or brown from iron oxides.

== History and occurrence ==
Its mineral form was first described in 1800, and was named after Sasso Pisano, Castelnuovo Val di Cecina, Pisa Province, Tuscany, Italy, where it was found. The mineral may be found in lagoons throughout Tuscany and Sasso. It is also found in the Lipari Islands and the US state of Nevada. It occurs in volcanic fumaroles and hot springs, deposited from steam, as well as in bedded sedimentary evaporite deposits.

== See also ==
- List of minerals
- Borax
