= Soffioni =

Volcanic vents in Italy

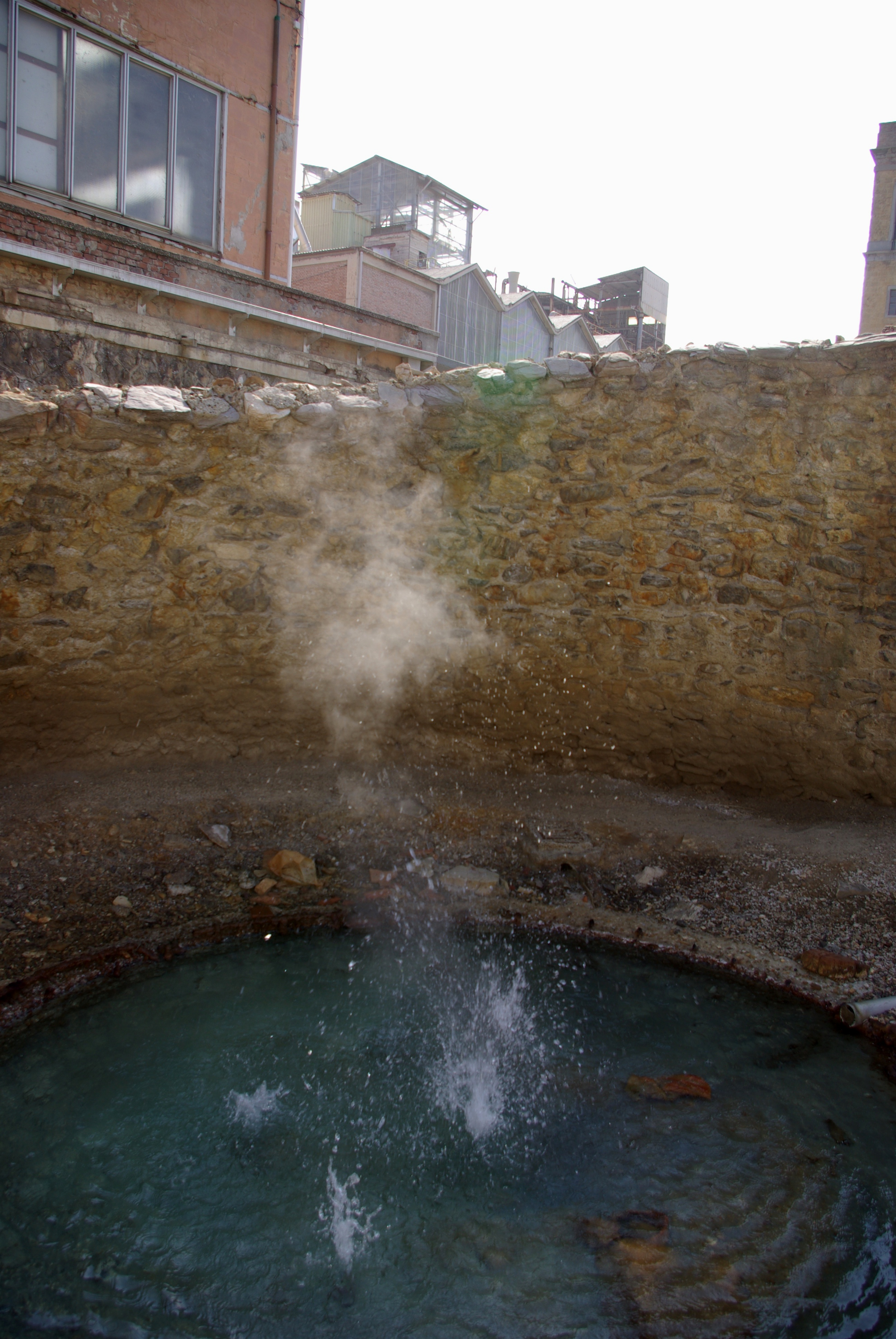
Soffioni in Larderello, Tuscany, Italy.

Soffioni (Italian: [sofˈfjoːni]; sometimes spelt suffioni), a name applied in Italy to certain volcanic vents which emit jets of steam, generally associated with hydrogen sulfide and carbon dioxide, sometimes also with a little ammonia and marsh gas.

The soffioni are usually arranged in groups, and are best represented in the Maremma of Tuscany, where they contain a small proportion of boric acid, for which they are utilized industrially. For such natural steam-holes, the French geologists often use the term soufflards in place of the Italian soffioni.
