= Boron deficiency (medicine) =

- Specialty: Endocrinology

Boron deficiency is a pathology which may occur in animals due to a lack of boron. A report given by E. Wayne Johnson et al. at the 2005 Alan D. Leman Swine Conference suggests that boron deficiency produces osteochondrosis in swine that is correctable by addition of 50 ppm of boron to the diet.

== In humans ==
There is limited research on how boron deficiency manifests in humans, with no widespread agreement on definitive signs and symptoms. Boron is not considered an essential nutrient as its biological role in humans is not yet firmly established, although it may play useful roles in bone formation, wound healing, sex hormone regulation, and brain health. There is no recommended daily intake (RDA) for boron, although a 1996 World Health Organization publication suggests 1 to 13 mg/day of boron as a safe intake range for adults.

A 2020 narrative review suggests that boron supplementation may benefit bone growth and maintenance by modifying calcium metabolism and increasing serum concentrations of estrogen, testosterone, and vitamin D. While more research is needed, boron deficiency may therefore be postulated to have deleterious effects on bone health.

== See also ==
- Boron in human health
- Ultratrace element
- Vitamin deficiency
