= R-56 (rocket) =

Family of Soviet rockets developed by the OKB-586 bureau

The R-56 were five proposed rockets developed by the OKB-586 design bureau under Mikhail Yangel. No formal terms for the five different designs have been discovered resulting in Bart Hendrickx writing in the Journal of the British Interplanetary Society referring to the initial two designs as the Small and Big versions. Hendrickx referred to the later three designs as “Monoblock”, “first polyblock” (similar to the Big R-56) and “second polyblock” (similar to the Small R-56).

The monoblock version was considered for use in the Soviet lunar program.

== History ==
The idea for the R-56 seems to have comes from a desire to build a missile that could carry Tsar Bomba type nuclear weapons. By February 1962 the concept was described in a presentation to Nikita Khrushchev as being an ICBM suitable for 50 tonne weapons as well as being able to launch space stations.

Formal design work, initially mainly focusing on the small R-56, took place between April 1962 and June 1964. By this point the R-56 was being treated almost entirely as a space launcher although some work was done exploring its potential as a Multiple reentry vehicle carrier. The designs at this stage were meant to use the RD-253 engine.

In August 1963 it was decided that the Small R-56 has too small a payload capacity and three new designs (“Monoblock”, “first polyblock” and “second polyblock”) using were produced with the monoblock being selected for further development. It was designed to be used in both two and four stage versions depending on the mission profile: two for low Earth orbit, four for geostationary and beyond. In its 4-stage version it was 67.8 m high.

It was planned to transport the rocket to its launch site by sea.

The R-56 program was formally ended on 19 June 1964 with the stated purpose of focusing on the N-1 Rocket design.

== Proposed uses ==
=== Earth orbit ===
It was suggested that the R-56 be used to place heavy (~40 tonne) military satellites into low Earth orbit as well as six tonne satellites into geostationary orbit.

=== Lunar missions ===
Proposed lunar missions included lunar satellites for photographic surveys of the Moon and a crewed flight around the Moon. The possibility of using the R-56 for crewed lunar landings (perhaps using a pair of launches to assemble the craft in low Earth orbit) was tentatively considered.

== Engine ==
The rockets were designed to use the RD-253 as their main engine. In late 1962 it was suggested that the rocket switch to the more powerful RD-270. While this was never formally adopted the idea remained under consideration.

== Model ==
A model of the R-56 survived in the collection of the Yuzhnoye Design Office
