= Laser chemical vapor deposition =

Process in semiconductor device fabrication

Laser chemical vapor deposition (LCVD) is a chemical process used to produce high purity, high performance films, fibers, and mechanical hardware (MEMS). It is a form of chemical vapor deposition in which a laser beam is used to locally heat the semiconductor substrate, causing the vapor deposition chemical reaction to proceed faster at that site. The process is used in the semiconductor industry for spot coating, the MEMS industry for 3-D printing of hardware such as springs and heating elements,^{2,6,7,9} and the composites industry for boron and ceramic fibers. As with conventional CVD, one or more gas phase precursors are thermally decomposed, and the resulting chemical species 1) deposit on a surface, or 2) react, form the desired compound, and then deposit on a surface, or a combination of (1) and (2).
