= Octahydrotriborate =

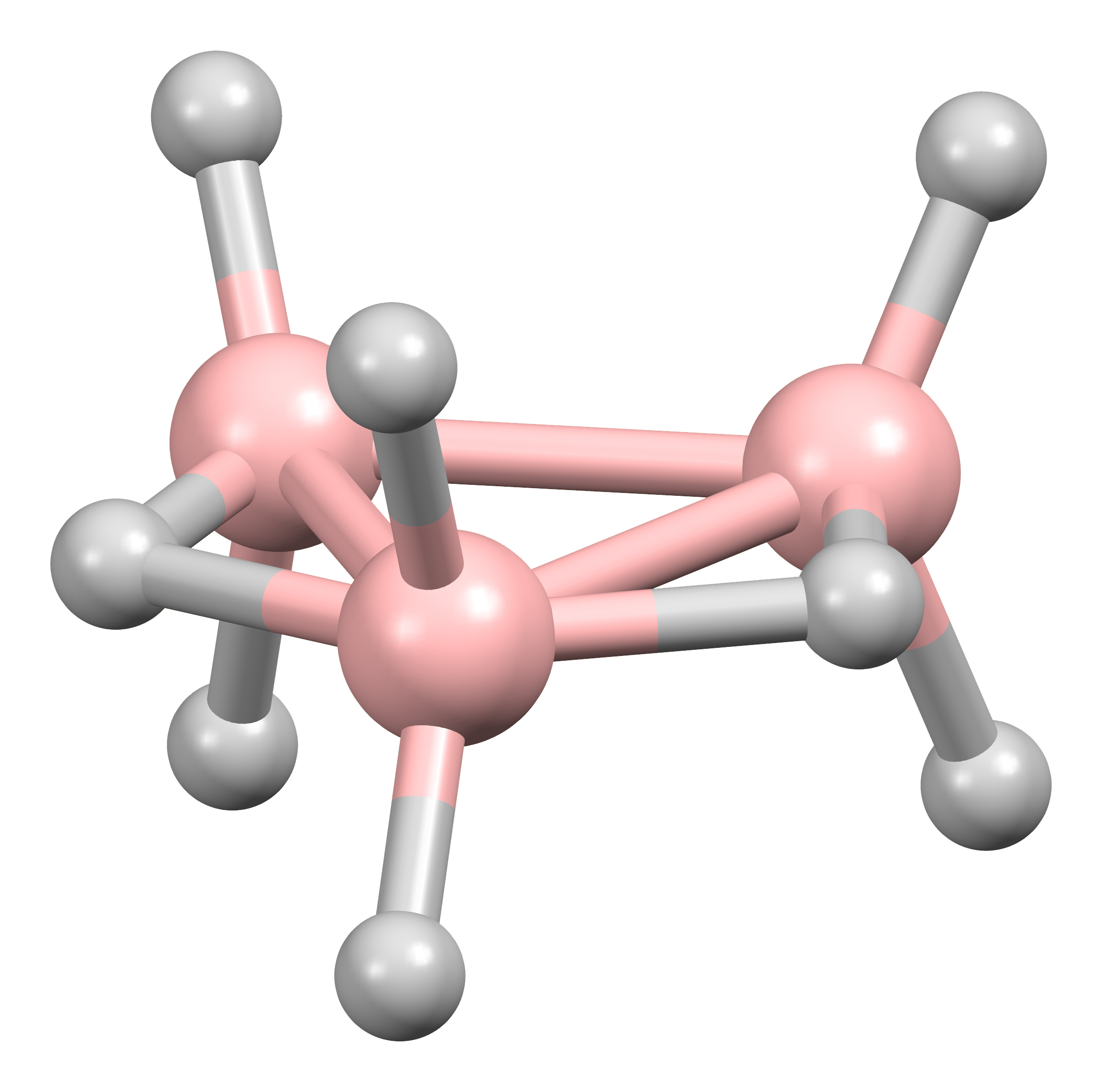

Identifiers
CAS Number	12429-74-2
3D model (JSmol)	Interactive image
- InChI: InChI=1S/B3H8/c4-1-2-3(1,4)5-2/h1-3H2/q-1 Key: QWUBYVSCVASZDU-UHFFFAOYSA-N
- SMILES: [BH2]12[H][BH2-]13[H][BH2]23

Properties
Chemical formula	B_{3}H_{8}^{−}
Molar mass	40.49 g·mol^{−1}
Appearance	colorless
- Except where otherwise noted, data are given for materials in their standard state (at 25 °C [77 °F], 100 kPa). Infobox references

Octahydrotriborate is the boron hydride anion B_{3}H_{8}^{−}. It forms a variety of salts that are colorless and air-stable. The tetrabutylammonium salt is soluble in organic solvents such as acetonitrile and methylene chloride. The anion is an intermediate is the synthesis of various higher boron hydrides, such as pentaborane(9). B_{3}H_{8}^{−} can be viewed as the conjugate base of triborane B_{3}H_{9}.

== Preparation ==
Octahydrotriborate is prepared by partial oxidation of borohydride with iodine or boron trifluoride:

3 BH_{4}^{−} + I_{2} → B_{3}H_{8}^{−} + 2 H_{2} + 2 I^{−}
5 BH_{4}^{−} + 4 BF_{3}O(C_{2}H_{5})_{2} → 2 B_{3}H_{8}^{−} + 2 H_{2} + 4 O(C_{2}H_{5})_{2} + 3 BF_{4}^{−}

== Structure and reactions ==
As shown by X-ray crystallography of various salts, B_{3}H_{8}^{−} consists of a distorted triangle of three BH_{2} vertices. Two edges of the triangle are occupied by bridging hydrides.

It is converted to the bromide B_{3}H_{7}Br^{−} using HBr (illustrating its hydridic character):

B_{3}H_{8}^{−} + HBr → B_{3}H_{7}Br^{−} + H_{2}

Pyrolysis of this bromide gives pentaborane(9).

5 B_{3}H_{7}Br^{−} → 3 B_{5}H_{9} + 5 Br^{−} + 4 H_{2}

Also consistent with its basicity, B_{3}H_{8}^{_} functions as a bidentate ligand in a variety of coordination complexes, e.g. Cr(B_{3}H_{8})_{2}.
