= Pentaborane(11) =

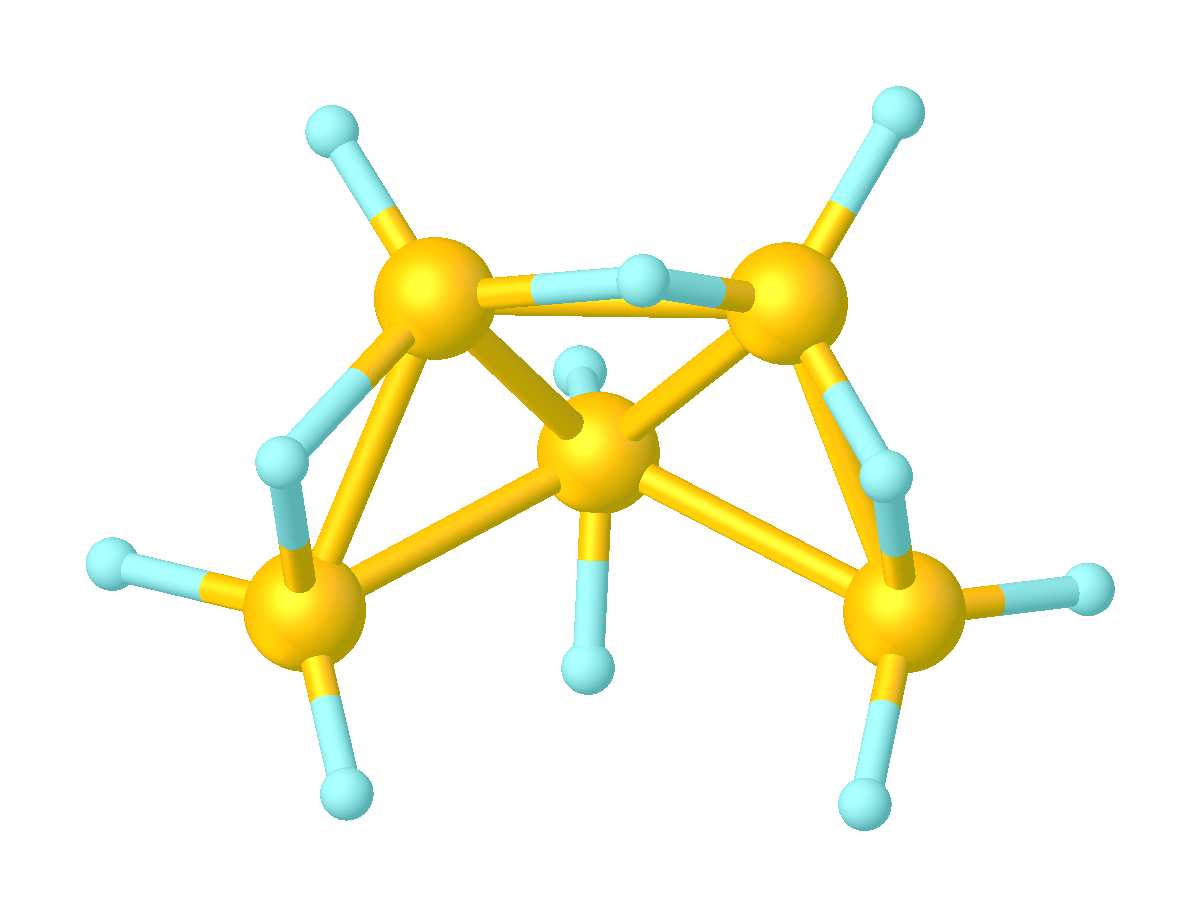

Identifiers
CAS Number	18433-84-6
3D model (JSmol)	Interactive image
ChemSpider	34987102
ECHA InfoCard	100.038.447
EC Number	242-307-4
UNII	79Z6OH65UV
CompTox Dashboard (EPA)	DTXSID901317015
- InChI: InChI=1S/B5H11/c1-3-4-2-5(1,3)4/h5H,3-4H2,1-2H3 Key: OPSKXWPMAKCNOG-UHFFFAOYSA-N
- SMILES: [BH3]1[BH2]2[BH]13[BH2]2[BH3]3

Properties
Chemical formula	B_{5}H_{11}
Molar mass	65.14 g·mol^{−1}
Melting point	−123 °C (−189 °F; 150 K)
Boiling point	63 °C (145 °F; 336 K)
- Except where otherwise noted, data are given for materials in their standard state (at 25 °C [77 °F], 100 kPa). Infobox references

Pentaborane(11) is an inorganic compound with the chemical formula B_{5}H_{11}. It is an obscure boron hydride cluster, especially relative to the heavily studied pentaborane(9) (B_{5}H_{9}). With two more hydrogen atoms than nido-pentaborane(9), pentaborane(11) is classified as an arachno- cluster.

== Synthesis ==
Like many boron hydride clusters, pentaborane(11) was originally obtained from the pyrolysis of diborane. A more systematic synthesis entails treatment of [B_{4}H_{9}]^{−} with boron tribromide. The Lewis acid abstracts hydride to give unstable B_{4}H_{8}, the precursor to B_{5}H_{11}:

[B_{4}H_{9}]^{−} + BBr_{3} → B_{4}H_{8} + HBBr_{3}^{−}
2 B_{4}H_{8} → B_{5}H_{11} + "B_{3}H_{5}"
