= Castelnuovo di Val di Cecina =

- Comune
- Comune di Castelnuovo di Val di Cecina
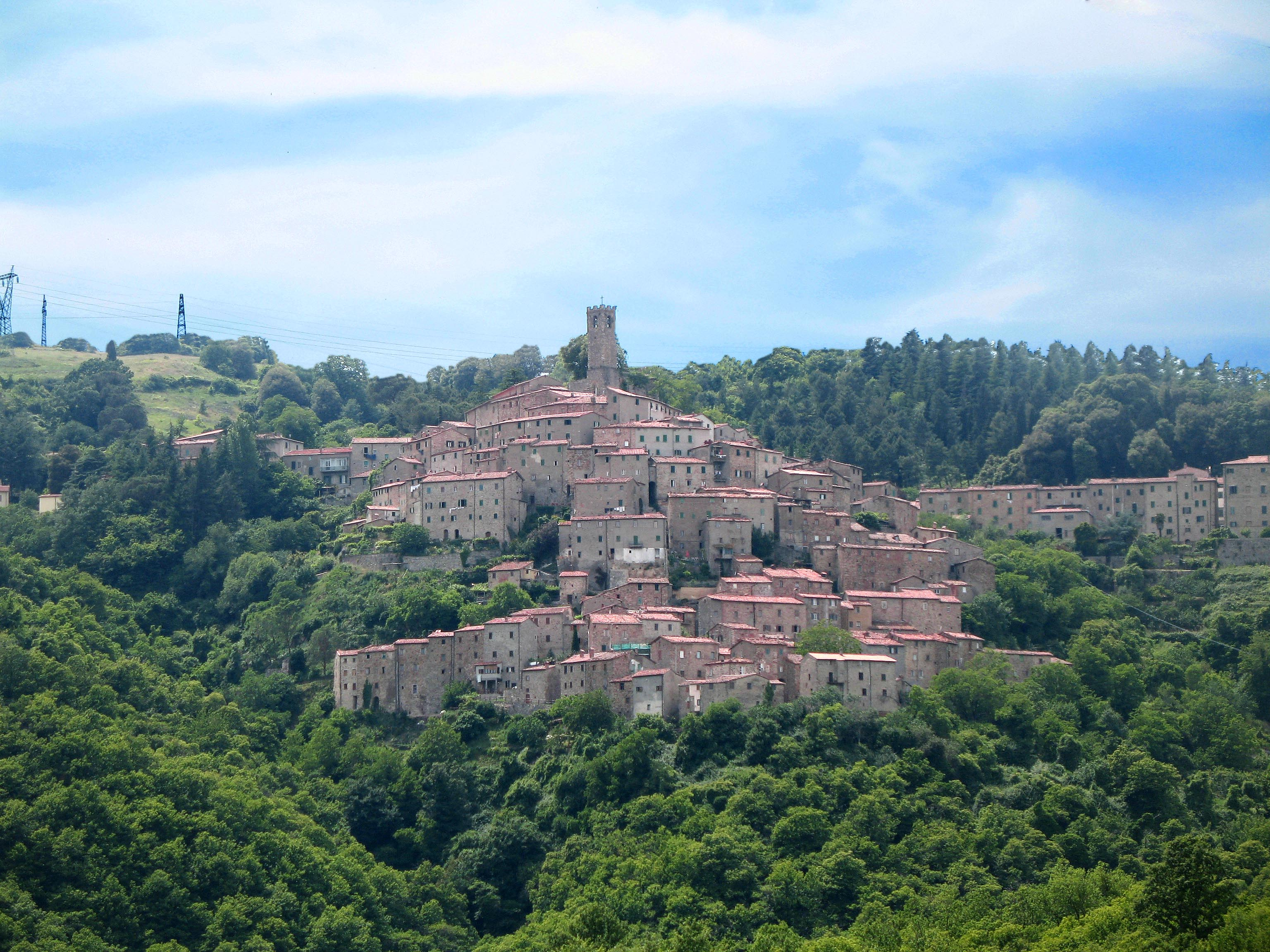
- Panorama of Castelnuovo di Val di Cecina

- Location within Italy Location within Tuscany
- Coordinates: 43°13′N 10°54′E
- Country: Italy
- Region: Tuscany
- Province: Pisa (PI)
- Frazioni: Montecastelli Pisano, Sasso Pisano

Government
  - Mayor: Alberto Ferrini

Area
  - Total: 89.02 km^{2} (34.37 sq mi)
- Elevation: 576 m (1,890 ft)

Population (30 June 2017)
  - Total: 2,198
  - Density: 24.69/km^{2} (63.95/sq mi)
- Demonym: Castelnuovini
- Time zone: UTC+1 (CET)
  - Summer (DST): UTC+2 (CEST)
- Postal code: 56041
- Dialing code: 0588
- Patron saint: St. Salvatore
- Saint day: 9 November
- Website: Official website

Castelnuovo di Val di Cecina is a comune (municipality) in the Province of Pisa in the Italian region Tuscany, located about 70 kilometres (43 mi) southwest of Florence and about 70 km (43 mi) southeast of Pisa.

Castelnuovo di Val di Cecina borders the following municipalities: Casole d'Elsa, Monterotondo Marittimo, Montieri, Pomarance, Radicondoli, Volterra.

== Symbols ==
The coat of arms of the municipality of Castelnuovo di Val di Cecina was recognized by D.P.C.M. on 20 April 1954.

The civic flag, granted by D.P.R. on 22 December 1954, is a blue drape.

== Monuments and places of interest ==
=== Religious architecture ===
- Cappella di Sant'Ottaviano
- Chiesa del Santissimo Salvatore
- Oratorio della Madonna del Piano
- Oratorio di San Rocco
- Cappella di Lagoni di Sasso
- Pieve di San Bartolomeo a Leccia
- Santuario della Madonna del Libro
- Oratorio della Purificazione
- Pieve dei Santi Jacopo e Filippo
- Chiesa di San Bartolomeo

== Population ==
Historical population

Year	Pop.	±%
1861	4,476	—
1871	4,748	+6.1%
1881	4,893	+3.1%
1901	5,496	+12.3%
1911	5,230	−4.8%
1921	5,100	−2.5%
1931	4,666	−8.5%

Year	Pop.	±%
1936	4,710	+0.9%
1951	5,022	+6.6%
1961	4,460	−11.2%
1971	3,336	−25.2%
1981	2,898	−13.1%
1991	2,678	−7.6%
2001	2,467	−7.9%

Source: Italian National Institute of Statistics
