= Pentaborane(9) =

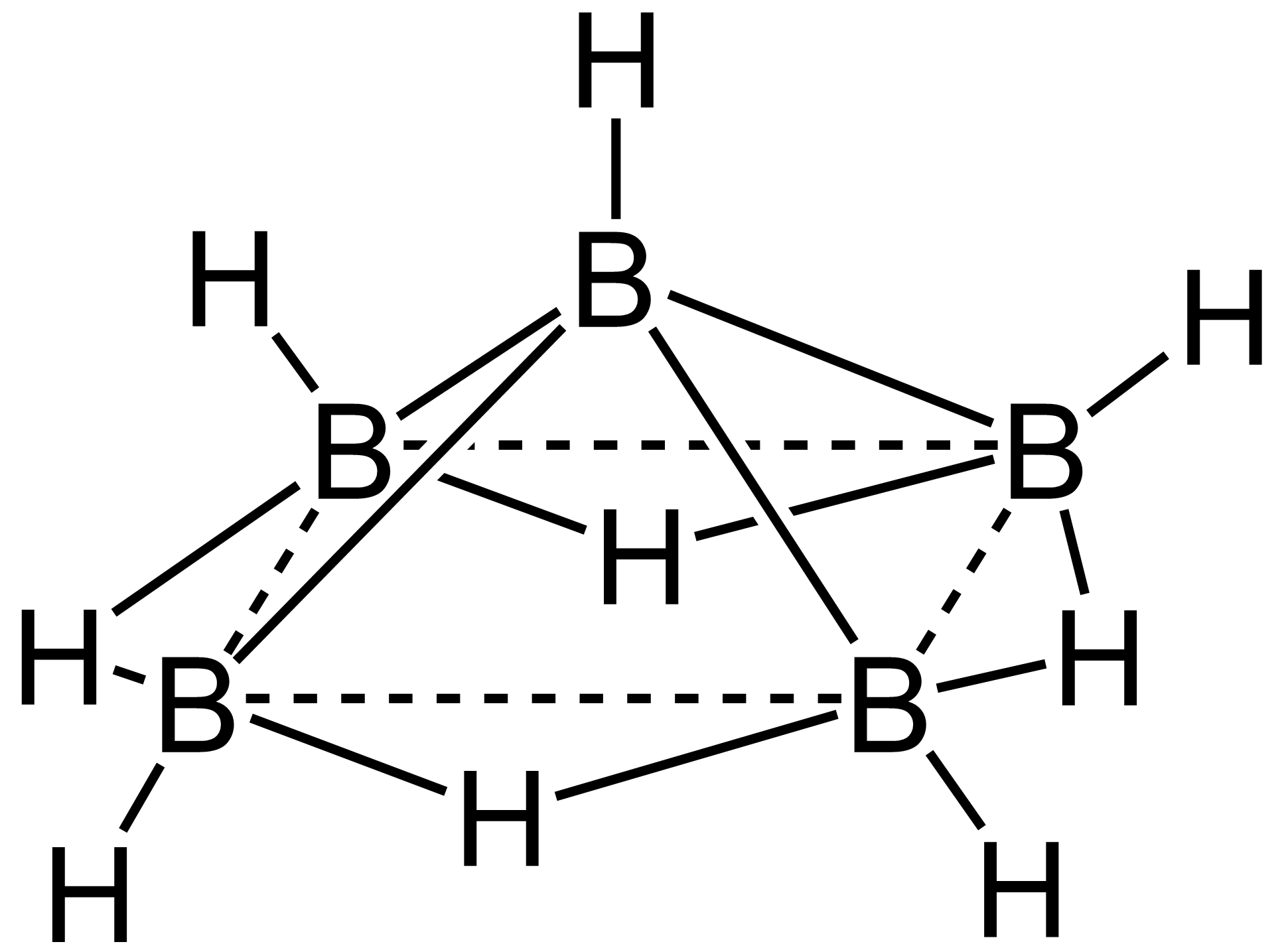

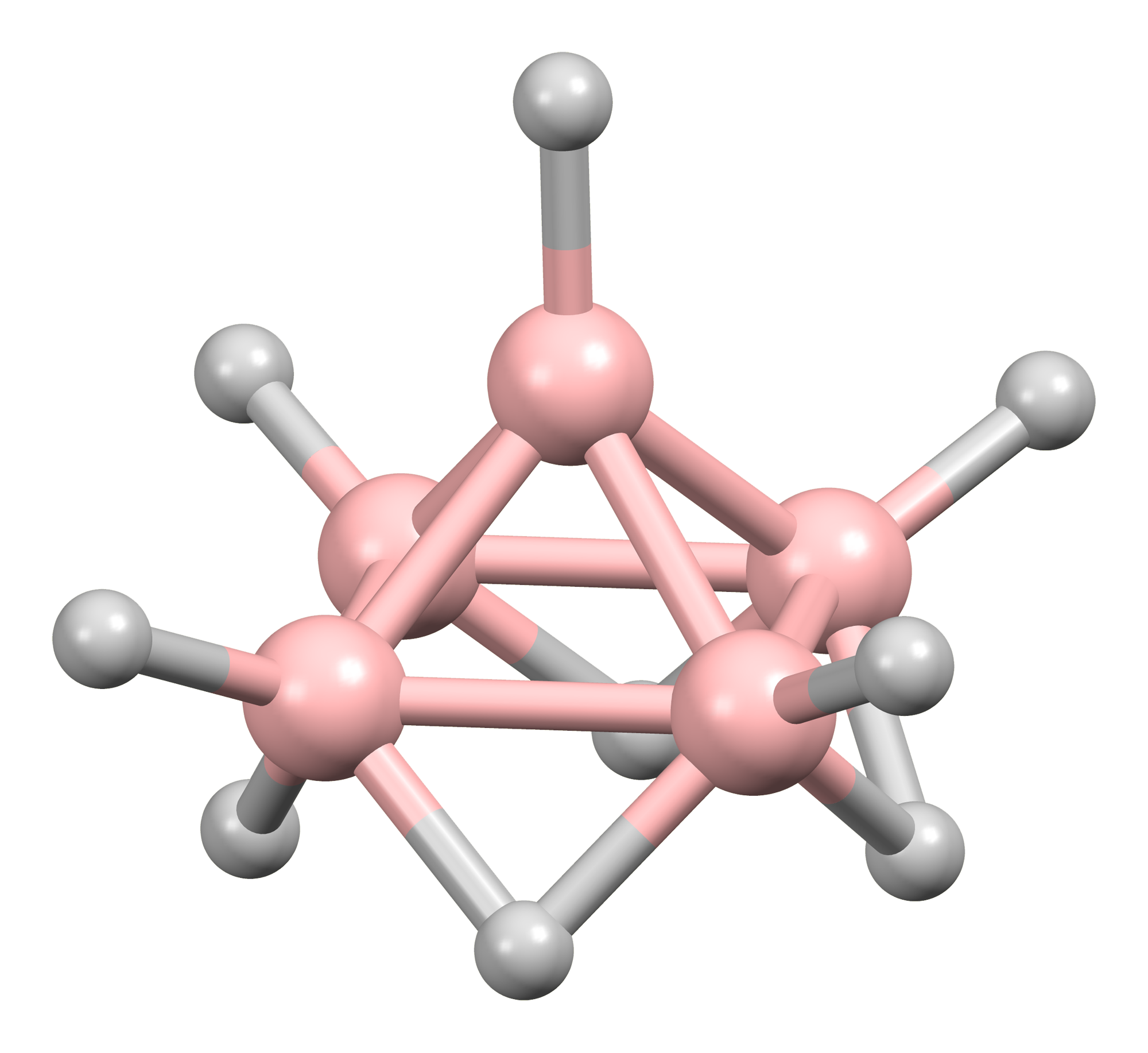

Names
- IUPAC name Pentaborane(9)
- Other names Pentaborane, pentaboron nonahydride, stable pentaborane

Identifiers
CAS Number	19624-22-7
3D model (JSmol)	Interactive image
ChEBI	CHEBI:33591
ChemSpider	24765156
ECHA InfoCard	100.039.253
EC Number	243-194-4
Gmelin Reference	26757
PubChem CID	Pentaborane
RTECS number	RY8925000
UNII	P1F0BN763J
UN number	1380
CompTox Dashboard (EPA)	DTXSID10880057
- InChI: InChI=1S/B5H9/c6-1-5-2(6)8-4(5)9-3(5)7-1/h1-5H Key: USBVLEBZPMQADS-UHFFFAOYSA-N; InChI=1/B5H9/c6-2-1-3(2,6)5(1,8-3)4(1,2,7-2)9-5/h1-5H Key: XPIBKKWNZBDJNI-UHFFFAOYAS
- SMILES: [H]1[BH]2[H][BH]3[BH]24[BH]1[H][BH]4[H]3

Properties
Chemical formula	B_{5}H_{9}
Molar mass	63.12 g/mol
Appearance	Colorless liquid
Odor	pungent, like sour milk
Density	0.618 g/mL
Melting point	−46.8 °C (−52.2 °F; 226.3 K)
Boiling point	58.4 °C (137.1 °F; 331.5 K)
Solubility in water	Reacts
Solubility	Benzene, Cyclohexane, and in other hydrocarbons
Vapor pressure	171 mmHg (20°C)

Hazards
- Occupational safety and health (OHS/OSH)
Main hazards	Extremely toxic, extremely flammable, can ignite spontaneously, corrosive
- GHS labelling
Pictograms	(GHS02: Flammable) (GHS07: Exclamation mark) (GHS05: Corrosive) (GHS06: Toxic) (GHS08: Health hazard)
Hazard statements	H226, H250, H315, H318, H330, H335, H336, H370, H372
NFPA 704 (fire diamond)	4 4 2 W
Flash point	30 °C (86 °F; 303 K)
Explosive limits	0.42%-?
- Lethal dose or concentration (LD, LC)
LD_{50} (median dose)	<50 mg/kg
LC_{50} (median concentration)	3 ppm (mouse, 4 hr); 6 ppm (rat, 4 hr); 3.4 ppm (mouse, 4 hr); 35 ppm (dog, 15 min); 244 ppm (monkey, 2 min); 67 ppm (rat, 5 min); 40 ppm (mouse, 5 min); 31 ppm (rat, 15 min); 19 ppm (mouse, 15 min); 15 ppm (rat, 30 min); 11 ppm (mouse, 30 min); 10 ppm (rat, 1 hr); 6 ppm (mouse, 1 hr)
- NIOSH (US health exposure limits)
PEL (Permissible)	TWA 0.005 ppm (0.01 mg/m^{3})
REL (Recommended)	TWA 0.005 ppm (0.01 mg/m^{3}) ST 0.015 ppm (0.03 mg/m^{3})
IDLH (Immediate danger)	1 ppm

Structure
Point group	C_{4v}
Dipole moment	2.13 D
- Except where otherwise noted, data are given for materials in their standard state (at 25 °C [77 °F], 100 kPa). verify (what is ?) Infobox references

Pentaborane(9) is an inorganic compound with the formula B_{5}H_{9}. It is one of the most common boron hydride clusters, although it is a highly reactive compound. Because of its high reactivity with oxygen, it was once evaluated as rocket or jet fuel. Like many of the smaller boron hydrides, pentaborane is colourless, diamagnetic, and volatile. It is related to pentaborane(11) (B_{5}H_{11}).

== Structure, synthesis, properties ==
Its structure is that of five atoms of boron arranged in a square pyramid. Each boron has a terminal hydride ligand and four hydrides span the edges of the base of the pyramid. It is classified as a nido cage.

It was first prepared by Alfred Stock by pyrolysis of diborane at about 200 °C. An improved synthesis starts from salts of octahydrotriborate (B_{3}H^{−}_{8}), which is converted to the bromide B_{3}H_{7}Br^{−} using HBr. Pyrolysis of this bromide gives pentaborane.

5 B_{3}H_{7}Br^{−} → 3 B_{5}H_{9} + 5 Br^{−} + 4 H_{2}

In the U.S., pentaborane was produced on a commercial scale by Callery Chemical Company.

Above 150 °C, it decomposes, producing hydrogen. Unlike diborane, It is quite stable at room temperature if stored properly. It is much more stable in presence of water than diborane.

Pentaborane is a highly polar compound, with a dipole moment of 2.13 D. It is soluble in hydrocarbons like benzene, and cyclohexane, and in greases including those used in lab equipment.

== Reactions ==
The chemistry of pentaborane is extensive. Halogenation give the symmetrical derivatives B_{5}H_{8}X, which can be isomerised to place the halide on the base of the square pyramid. With strong bases such as alkyl lithium reagents, it can be deprotonated and the resulting lithium salts react with diverse electrophiles to give substituted derivatives. It is Lewis acidic, forming double adducts with two equivalents of trimethylphosphine. Pentaborane is used for the synthesis of other boron hydride clusters. It is also a precursor to metallaboranes. For example, it reacts with diiron nonacarbonyl to give B_{4}H_{8}Fe(CO)_{3}.

== History of its use as a fuel ==
Pentaborane was evaluated by both the U.S. and Russian armed services as a so-called "exotic fuel". Because simple boron compounds burn with a characteristic green flame, the nickname for this fuel in the U.S. industry was "Green Dragon". In terms of heat of combustion, pentaborane surpasses its equivalent carbon compounds because their self-linking element, carbon, weighs at least one dalton more than an atom of boron does, and some boranes contain more hydrogen than the carbon equivalent. The ease of breaking the chemical bonds of the compound is also taken into consideration.

Interest in this substance began as a possible fuel for high-speed jets. The propellant mix that would produce the greatest specific impulse for a rocket motor is sometimes given as oxygen difluoride and pentaborane. During the early years of the space race and the missile gap, American rocket engineers thought they could more cheaply produce a rocket that would compete with the Soviets by using an existing first stage and putting an upper stage with an engine that produces thrust at a very high specific impulse atop it, so projects were begun to investigate this fuel.

This pentaborane was considered for use as a fuel by North American Aviation when the XB-70 Valkyrie was in the planning stages, but the aircraft ended up using hydrocarbon fuel instead. Pentaborane was also investigated to be used as a bipropellant with nitrogen tetroxide. In the Soviet Union, Valentin Glushko used it for the experimental RD-270M rocket engine, under development between 1962 and 1970.

Other boranes were evaluated as fuels, including propylpentaborane (BEF-2) and ethyldecaborane (REF-3). Diborane and decaborane and their derivates were also investigated.

Problems with this fuel include its toxicity and its characteristic of bursting into flame on contact with the air. Furthermore, its exhaust (when used in a jet engine) would also be toxic.

The US destroyed its last stockpiles of "Green Dragon" in 2000, long after the pentaborane had been discarded as unworkable. The destruction procedure hydrolyzed the pentaborane with steam to yield hydrogen and a boric acid solution. The long delay occurred in part because there are no industrial plants consuming pentaborane as a feedstock. Instead, army engineers constructed a bespoke system, nicknamed the "Dragon Slayer".

== Safety ==
Above 30 °C it can form explosive concentration of vapors with air. Its vapors are heavier than air. It is pyrophoric—can ignite spontaneously in contact with air, even when slightly impure. It can also readily form shock sensitive explosive compounds, and reacts violently with some fire suppressants, notably with halocarbons and water. It is highly toxic and symptoms of lower-level exposure may occur with up to 48 hours delay. Its acute toxicity is comparable to some nerve agents.

Occupational exposure limits for pentaborane set by the Occupational Safety and Health Administration and National Institute for Occupational Safety and Health stand at 0.005 ppm (0.01 mg/m^{3}) over an eight-hour time-weighted average, with a short-term exposure limit of 0.015 ppm (0.03 mg/m^{3}). The acute toxicity of pentaborane has caused it to be considered immediately dangerous to life and health, with a limit set at 1 ppm.

== See also ==
- Zip fuel
