= Hexaborane =

Hexaborane can refer to:

- Hexaborane(10) (B_{6}H_{10})
- Hexaborane(12) (B_{6}H_{12})
