= Octadecaborane =

Octadecaborane(22)
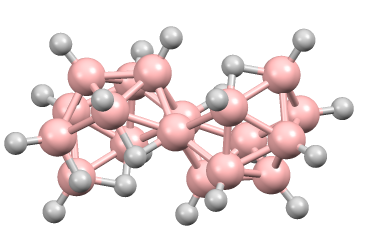

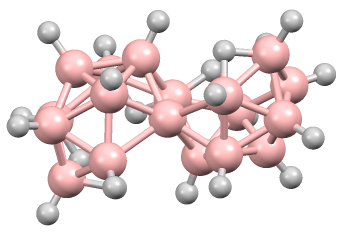

Names
- Other names octadecaborane; octadecaboron doicosahydride; octodecaborane; n-Octadecaborane; i-Octadecaborane

Identifiers
CAS Number	21107-56-2 (n-octadecaborane); 21107-45-9 (i-octadecaborane)
3D model (JSmol)	Interactive image
ECHA InfoCard	100.224.871
EC Number	695-976-3
CompTox Dashboard (EPA)	DTXSID401280881
- InChI: InChI=1S/B18H22/c19-7-1-3(7)5(1)9(1)13(1,7)18(9,23-13)6-2-4(6)8(2,16(4,20-8)12(4,6,18)22-16)14(2)10(2,6,18)17(5,9,14,18,24-14)11(3,5)15(3,7,19)21-11/h1-16H Key: DQBKLUBTQJQDSO-UHFFFAOYSA-N
- SMILES: [H]1[BH]234[H][BH]225[BH]336[BH]141[BH]478[H][B]449%10%11[BH]%12%13%14[H][BH]%12%12%15[H][BH]%12%12%16[BH]%17%18%19[H][B]24%172([BH]533[BH]617[BH]8923)[BH]%10%181[BH]%12%192[BH]%13%15%16[BH]%11%1412

Properties
Chemical formula	B_{18}H_{22}
Molar mass	216.77 g/mol
Appearance	White to off white powder
Density	1.012 g/cm^{3}
Melting point	180 and 129 °C (356 and 264 °F; 453 and 402 K) n-B_{18}H_{22} and i-B_{18}H_{22} respectively
- Except where otherwise noted, data are given for materials in their standard state (at 25 °C [77 °F], 100 kPa). verify (what is ?) Infobox references

Octadecaborane is an inorganic compound, a boron hydride cluster with chemical formula B_{18}H_{22}. It is a colorless flammable solid, like many higher boron hydrides. Although the compound has no practical applications, its structure is of theoretical and pedagogical interest.

== Synthesis ==
It is formed by oxidative degradation of B_{20}H_{18}^{2−} or by oxidative coupling of B_{9}H_{12}^{−}.

== Structure ==
Two isomers are known of octadecaborane, providing the first example of isomers in a boron-hydride cluster. The clusters are also of interest because the boron centers shared between the two subunits have an unusually high number of B-B interactions. The isomers consists of two B_{9}H_{11} polyhedral subunits, each having a decaborane-like form, joined at a B–B edge. These two boron atoms are each coordinated to six others; this compound was the first one found to have such a high number of borons coordinated around a single boron center. There are two different geometric isomers of this compound, differing in the orientation of the two edge-fused polyhedra to each other. This compound was the first borane found to have multiple isomeric forms. Among the geometric isomers, one with chirality was the first borane to be resolved into its separate enantiomers, and was only the second chiral borane known at that time.
