= Inorganic chemistry =

Field of chemistry

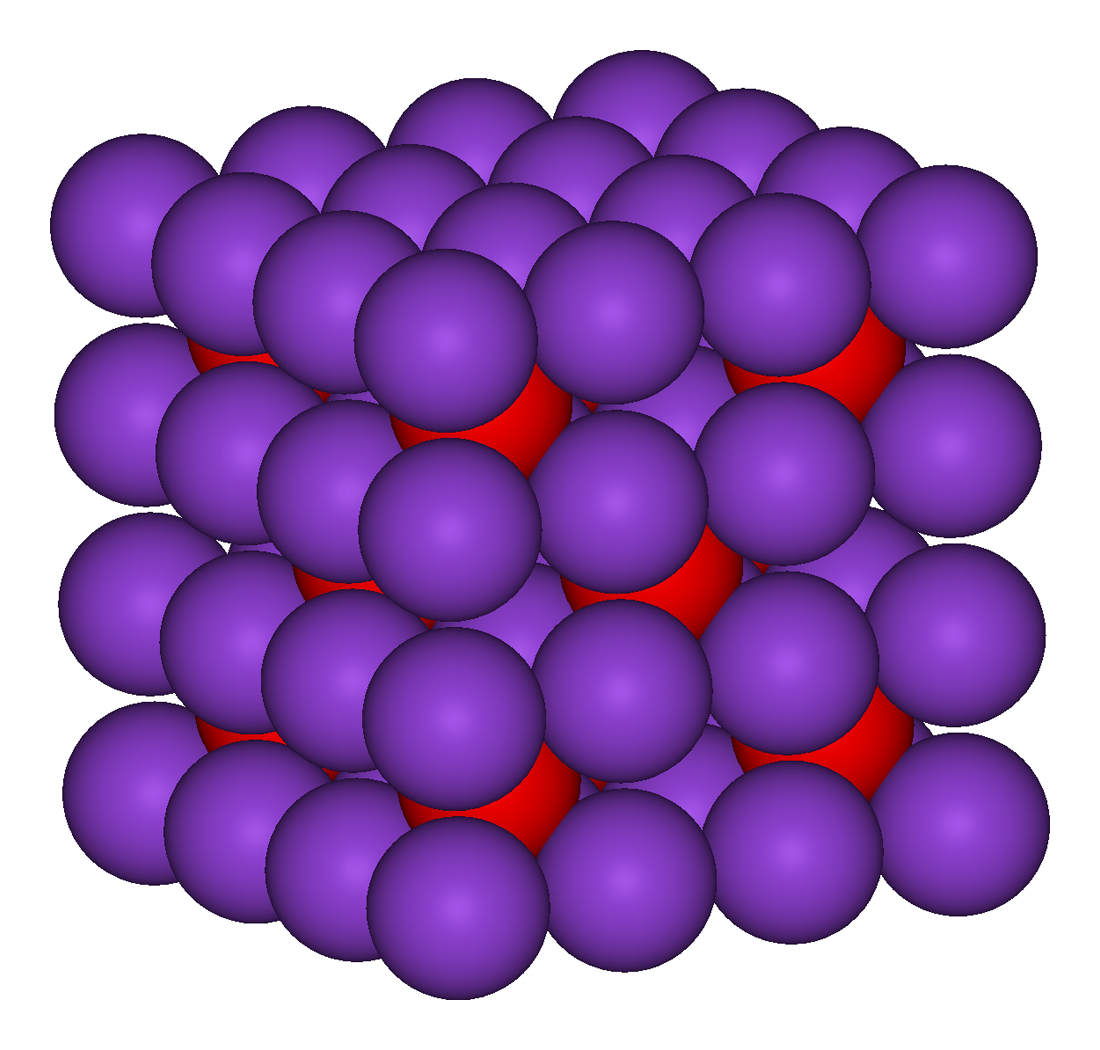
The structure of the ionic framework in potassium oxide, K_{2}O

Inorganic chemistry is the branch of chemistry that studies the preparation, properties, and behavior of inorganic and organometallic compounds. It mainly deals with compounds that are not based on carbon, unlike organic chemistry. However, there is some overlap between inorganic and organic chemistry, especially in organometallic chemistry. Inorganic chemistry is widely used in many areas such as catalysts, materials, paints and pigments, coatings, medicines, fuels, and agriculture.

== Occurrence ==
Many inorganic compounds are found in nature as minerals. Soil may contain iron sulfide as pyrite or calcium sulfate as gypsum. Inorganic compounds are also found multitasking as biomolecules: as electrolytes (sodium chloride), in energy storage (ATP) or in construction (the polyphosphate backbone in DNA).

== Bonding ==
Inorganic compounds can have different types of chemical bonds. Some of them are ionic compounds, which are made up of positively charged ions (cations) and negatively charged ions (anions) held together by ionic bonds. For example, magnesium chloride (MgCl₂) contains Mg²⁺ and Cl⁻ ions, while sodium hydroxide (NaOH) contains Na⁺ and OH⁻ ions.

Some inorganic compounds have covalent bonds, in which atoms share electrons. Others have polar covalent bonds, which have properties between ionic and covalent bonds. This type of bonding is common in compounds such as oxides, carbonates, and halides.

Many inorganic compounds have high melting points because their particles are strongly held together. Some ionic compounds, such as sodium chloride (NaCl), dissolve easily in water.

When one reactant contains hydrogen atoms, a reaction can take place by exchanging protons in acid-base chemistry. In a more general definition, any chemical species capable of binding to electron pairs is called a Lewis acid; conversely any molecule that tends to donate an electron pair is referred to as a Lewis base. As a refinement of acid-base interactions, the HSAB theory takes into account polarizability and size of ions.

== Subdivisions of inorganic chemistry ==
Subdivisions of inorganic chemistry are numerous, but include:

- organometallic chemistry, compounds with metal-carbon bonds. This area touches on organic synthesis, which employs many organometallic catalysts and reagents.
- cluster chemistry, compounds with several metals bound together with metal–metal bonds or bridging ligands.
- bioinorganic chemistry, biomolecules that contain metals. This area touches on medicinal chemistry.
- materials chemistry and solid state chemistry, extended (i.e. polymeric) solids exhibiting properties not seen for simple molecules. Many practical themes are associated with these areas, including ceramics.

=== Industrial inorganic chemistry ===
Inorganic chemistry is a highly practical area of science. Traditionally, the scale of a nation's economy could be evaluated by their productivity of sulfuric acid.

An important man-made inorganic compound is ammonium nitrate, used for fertilization. The ammonia is produced through the Haber process. Nitric acid is prepared from the ammonia by oxidation. Another large-scale inorganic material is portland cement. Inorganic compounds are used as catalysts such as vanadium(V) oxide for the oxidation of sulfur dioxide and titanium(III) chloride for the polymerization of alkenes. Many inorganic compounds are used as reagents in organic chemistry such as lithium aluminium hydride.

== Descriptive inorganic chemistry ==
Descriptive inorganic chemistry focuses on the classification of compounds based on their properties. Partly the classification focuses on the position in the periodic table of the heaviest element (the element with the highest atomic weight) in the compound, partly by grouping compounds by their structural similarities.

=== Coordination compounds ===
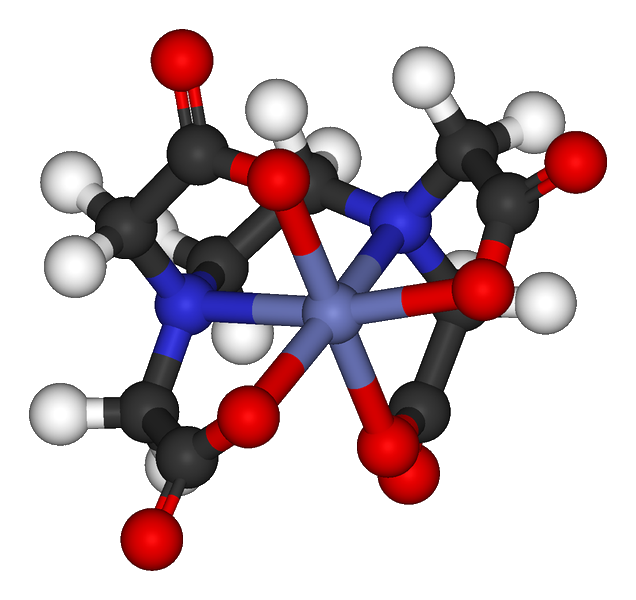
EDTA chelates an octahedrally coordinated Co^{3+} ion in [Co(EDTA)]^{−}

Classical coordination compounds feature metals bound to "lone pairs" of electrons residing on the main group atoms of ligands such as H_{2}O, NH_{3}, Cl^{−}, and CN^{−}. In modern coordination compounds almost all organic and inorganic compounds can be used as ligands. The "metal" usually is a metal from the groups 3–13, as well as the trans-lanthanides and trans-actinides, but from a certain perspective, all chemical compounds can be described as coordination complexes.

The stereochemistry of coordination complexes can be quite rich, as hinted at by Werner's separation of two enantiomers of [Co((OH)_{2}Co(NH_{3})_{4})_{3}]^{6+}, an early demonstration that chirality is not inherent to organic compounds. A topical theme within this specialization is supramolecular coordination chemistry.

- Examples: [Co(EDTA)]^{−}, [Co(NH_{3})_{6}]^{3+}, TiCl_{4}(THF)_{2}.

Coordination compounds show a rich diversity of structures, varying from tetrahedral for titanium (e.g., TiCl_{4}) to square planar for some nickel complexes to octahedral for coordination complexes of cobalt. A range of transition metals can be found in biologically important compounds, such as iron in hemoglobin.

- Examples: iron pentacarbonyl, titanium tetrachloride, cisplatin

=== Main group compounds ===
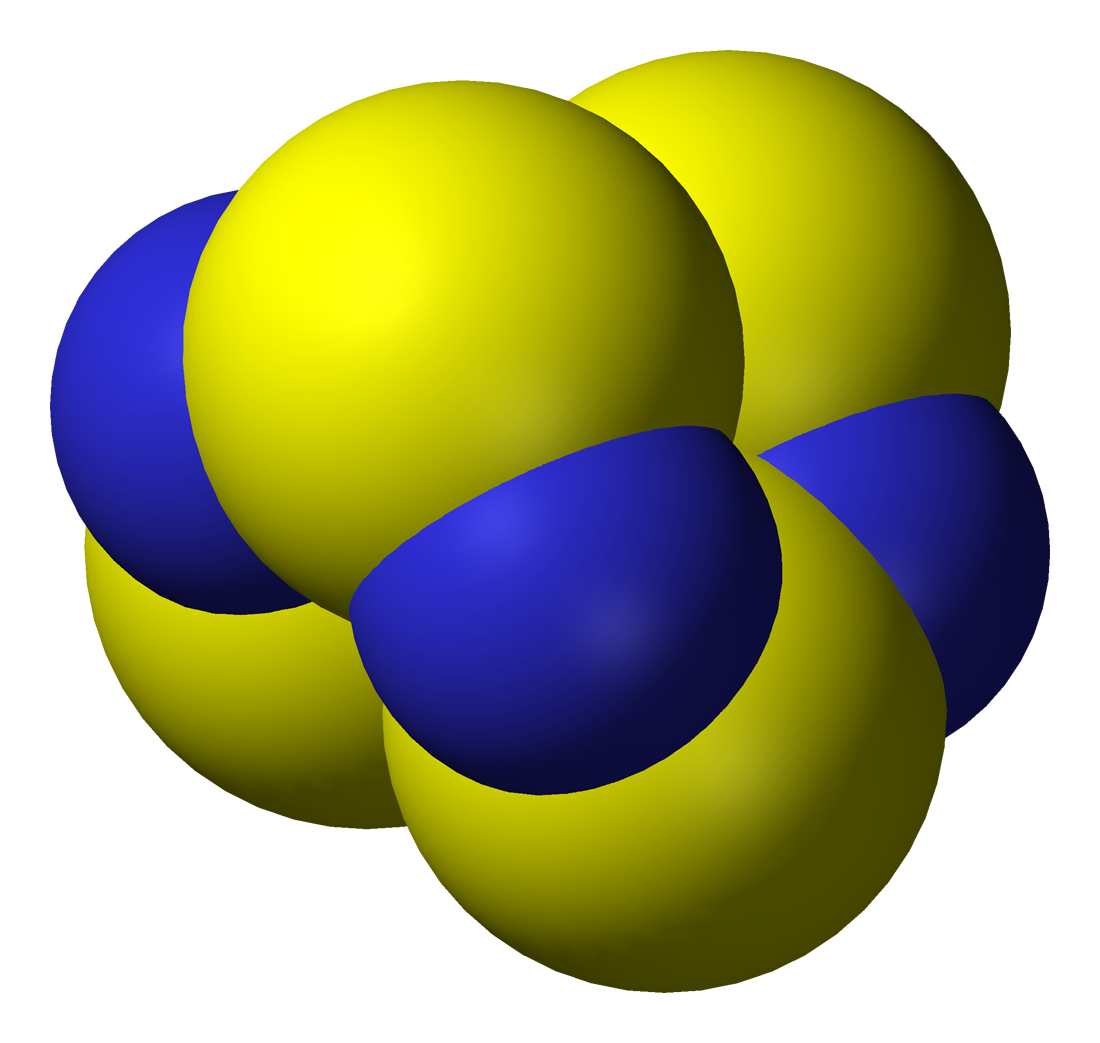
Tetrasulfur tetranitride, S_{4}N_{4}, is a main group compound that continues to intrigue chemists

These species feature elements from groups I, II, III, IV, V, VI, VII, 0 (excluding hydrogen) of the periodic table. Due to their often similar reactivity, the elements in group 3 (Sc, Y, and La) and group 12 (Zn, Cd, and Hg) are also generally included, and the lanthanides and actinides are sometimes included as well.

Main group compounds have been known since the beginnings of chemistry, e.g., elemental sulfur and the distillable white phosphorus. Experiments on oxygen, O_{2}, by Lavoisier and Priestley not only identified an important diatomic gas, but opened the way for describing compounds and reactions according to stoichiometric ratios. The discovery of a practical synthesis of ammonia using iron catalysts by Carl Bosch and Fritz Haber in the early 1900s deeply impacted mankind, demonstrating the significance of inorganic chemical synthesis. Typical main group compounds are SiO_{2}, SnCl_{4}, and N_{2}O. Many main group compounds can also be classed as "organometallic", as they contain organic groups, e.g., B(CH_{3})_{3}. Main group compounds also occur in nature, e.g., phosphate in DNA, and therefore may be classed as bioinorganic. Conversely, organic compounds lacking (many) hydrogen ligands can be classed as "inorganic", such as the fullerenes, buckytubes and binary carbon oxides.

- Examples: tetrasulfur tetranitride S_{4}N_{4}, diborane B_{2}H_{6}, silicones, buckminsterfullerene C_{60}.

Noble gas compounds include several derivatives of xenon and krypton.

- Examples: xenon hexafluoride XeF_{6}, xenon trioxide XeO_{3}, and krypton difluoride KrF_{2}

=== Organometallic compounds ===
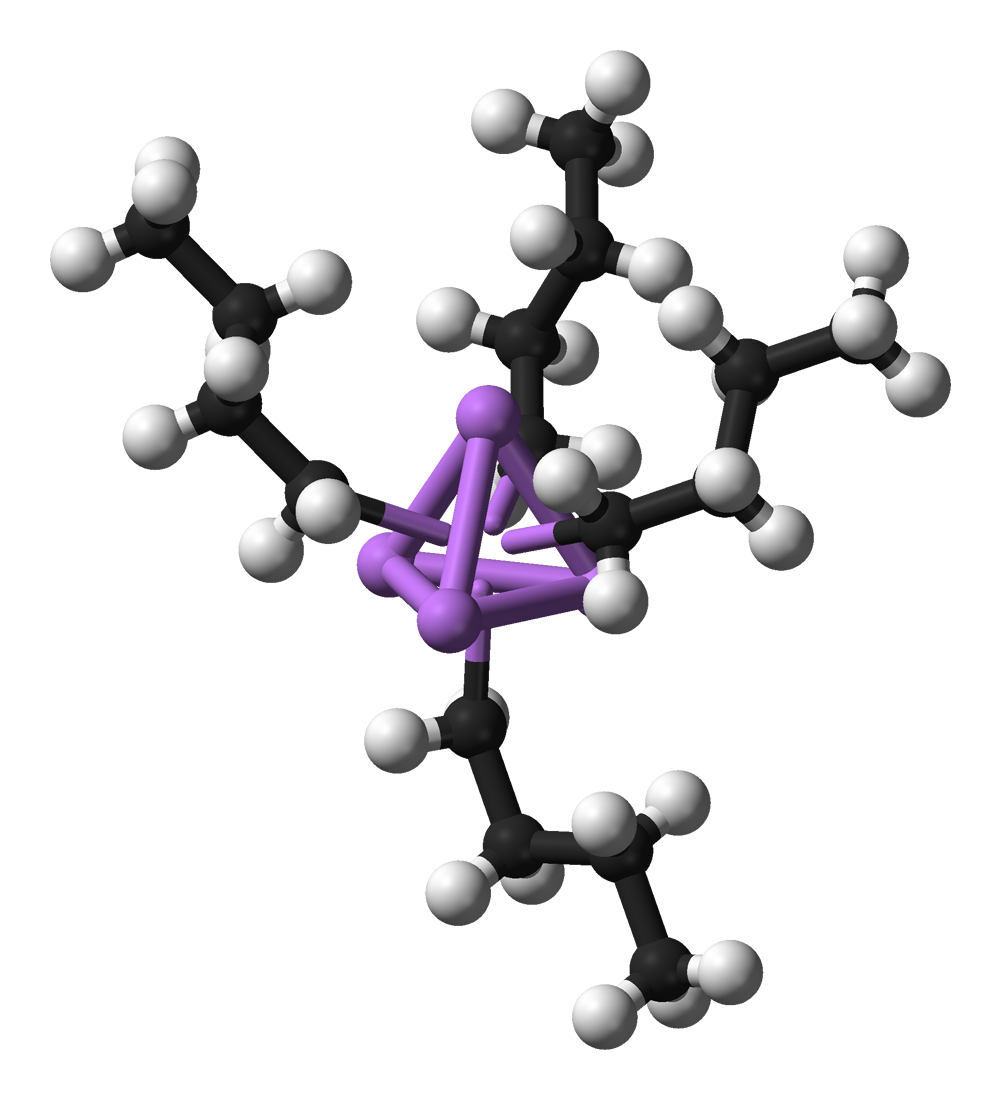
Organolithium reagents are most often found in polymeric form, such as n-butyllithium shown here

Usually, organometallic compounds are considered to contain the M-C-H group. The metal (M) in these species can either be a main group element or a transition metal. Operationally, the definition of an organometallic compound is more relaxed to include also highly lipophilic complexes such as metal carbonyls and even metal alkoxides.

Organometallic compounds are mainly considered a special category because organic ligands are often sensitive to hydrolysis or oxidation, necessitating that organometallic chemistry employs more specialized preparative methods than was traditional in Werner-type complexes. Synthetic methodology, especially the ability to manipulate complexes in solvents of low coordinating power, enabled the exploration of very weakly coordinating ligands such as hydrocarbons, H_{2}, and N_{2}. Because the ligands are petrochemicals in some sense, the area of organometallic chemistry has greatly benefited from its relevance to industry.

- Examples: Cyclopentadienyliron dicarbonyl dimer (C_{5}H_{5})Fe(CO)_{2}CH_{3}, ferrocene Fe(C_{5}H_{5})_{2}, molybdenum hexacarbonyl Mo(CO)_{6}, triethylborane Et_{3}B, Tris(dibenzylideneacetone)dipalladium(0) Pd_{2}(dba)_{3}

=== Cluster compounds ===
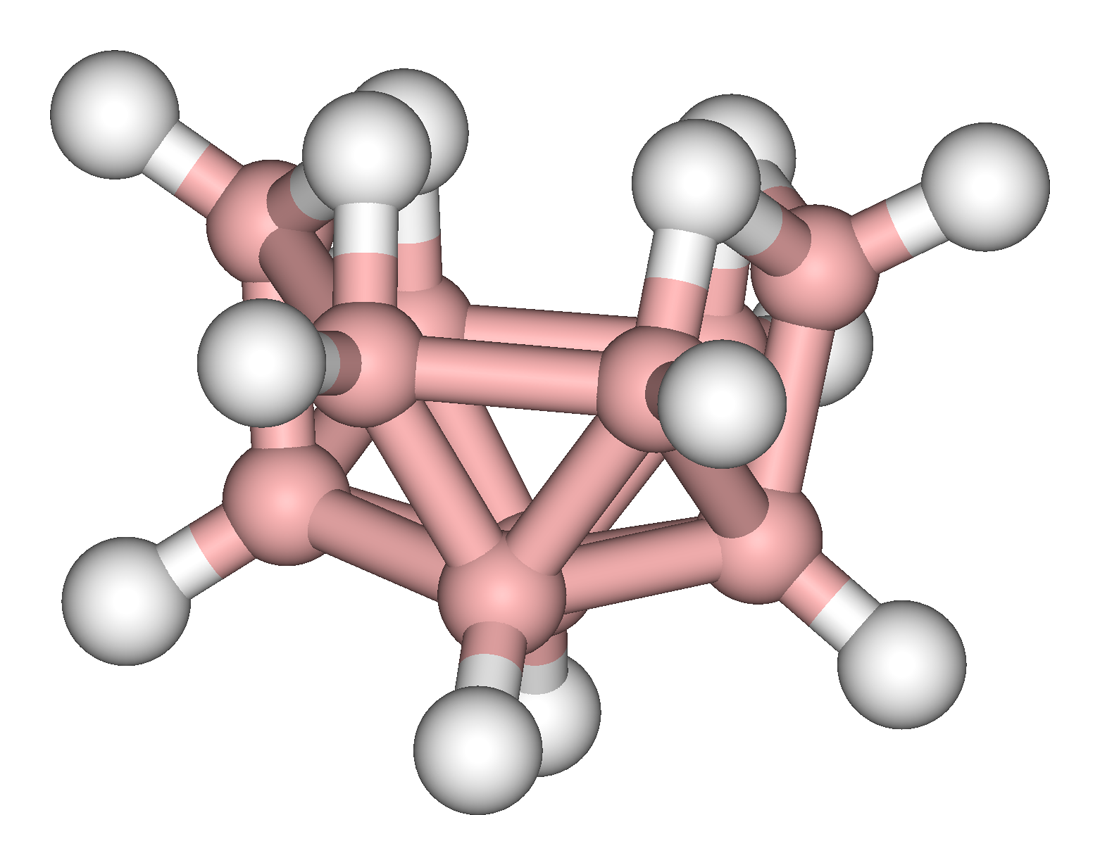
Decaborane is a powerfully toxic cluster compound of boron

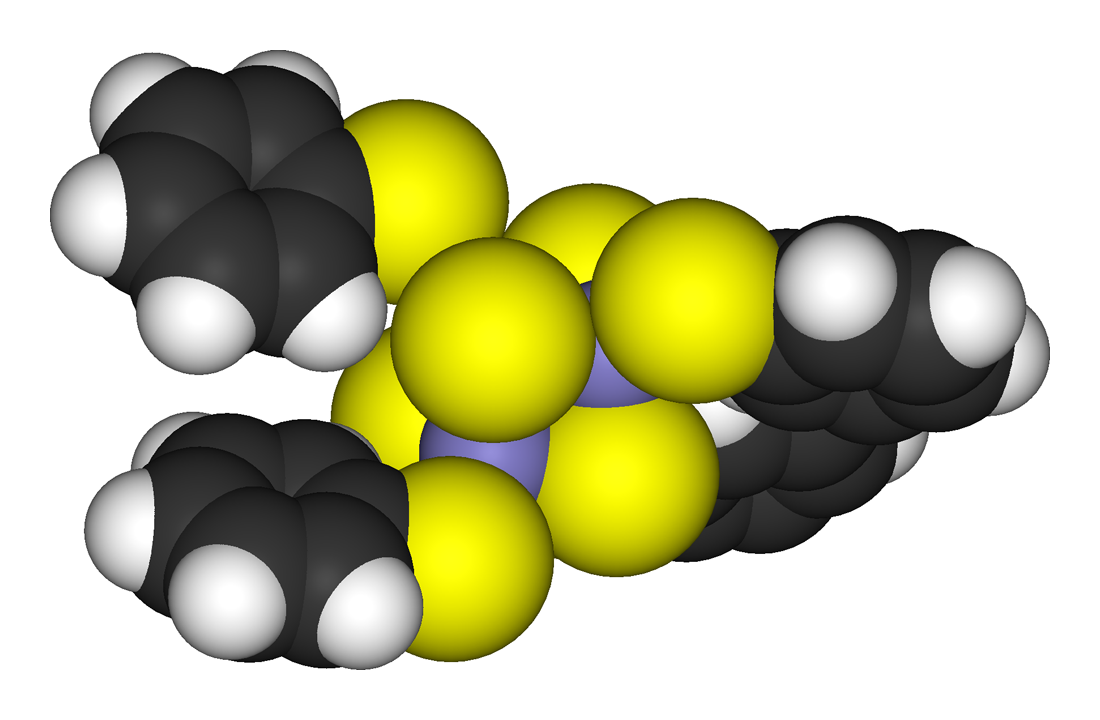
Iron–sulfur clusters are central components of iron–sulfur proteins, essential for human metabolism

Clusters can be found in all classes of chemical compounds. According to the commonly accepted definition, a cluster consists minimally of a triangular set of atoms that are directly bonded to each other. But metal–metal bonded dimetallic complexes are highly relevant to the area. Clusters occur in "pure" inorganic systems, organometallic chemistry, main group chemistry, and bioinorganic chemistry. The distinction between very large clusters and bulk solids is increasingly blurred. This interface is the chemical basis of nanoscience or nanotechnology and specifically arise from the study of quantum size effects in cadmium selenide clusters. Thus, large clusters can be described as an array of bound atoms intermediate in character between a molecule and a solid.

- Examples: Fe_{3}(CO)_{12}, B_{10}H_{14}, [Mo_{6}Cl_{14}]^{2−}, 4Fe-4S

=== Bioinorganic compounds ===
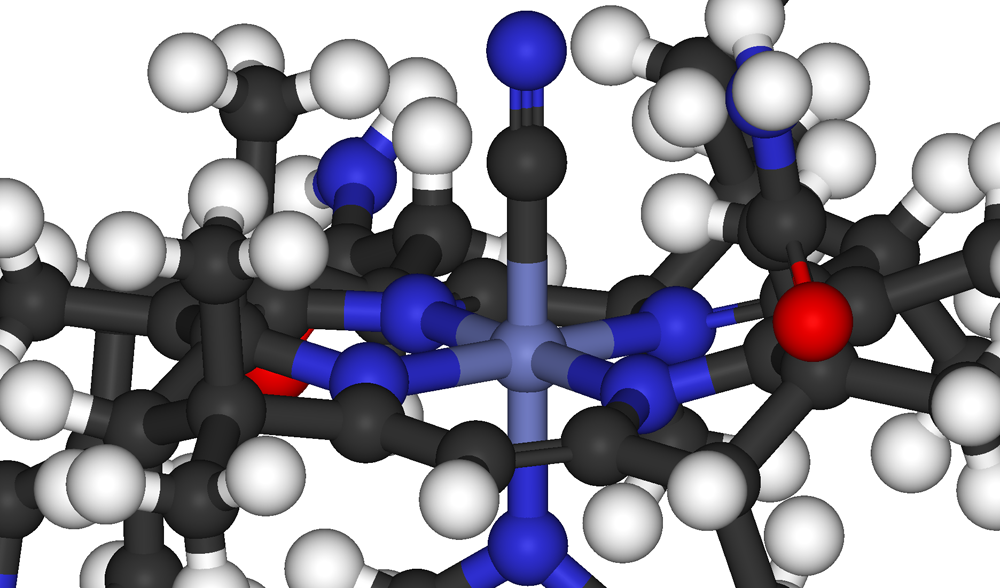
The octahedral cobalt centre of Vitamin B_{12}

By definition, these compounds occur in nature, but the subfield includes anthropogenic species, such as pollutants (e.g., methylmercury) and drugs (e.g., Cisplatin). The field, which incorporates many aspects of biochemistry, includes many kinds of compounds, e.g., the phosphates in DNA, and also metal complexes containing ligands that range from biological macromolecules, commonly peptides, to ill-defined species such as humic acid, and to water (e.g., coordinated to gadolinium complexes employed for MRI). Traditionally bioinorganic chemistry focuses on electron- and energy-transfer in proteins relevant to respiration. Medicinal inorganic chemistry includes the study of both non-essential and essential elements with applications to diagnosis and therapies.

- Examples: hemoglobin, methylmercury, carboxypeptidase

=== Solid state compounds ===
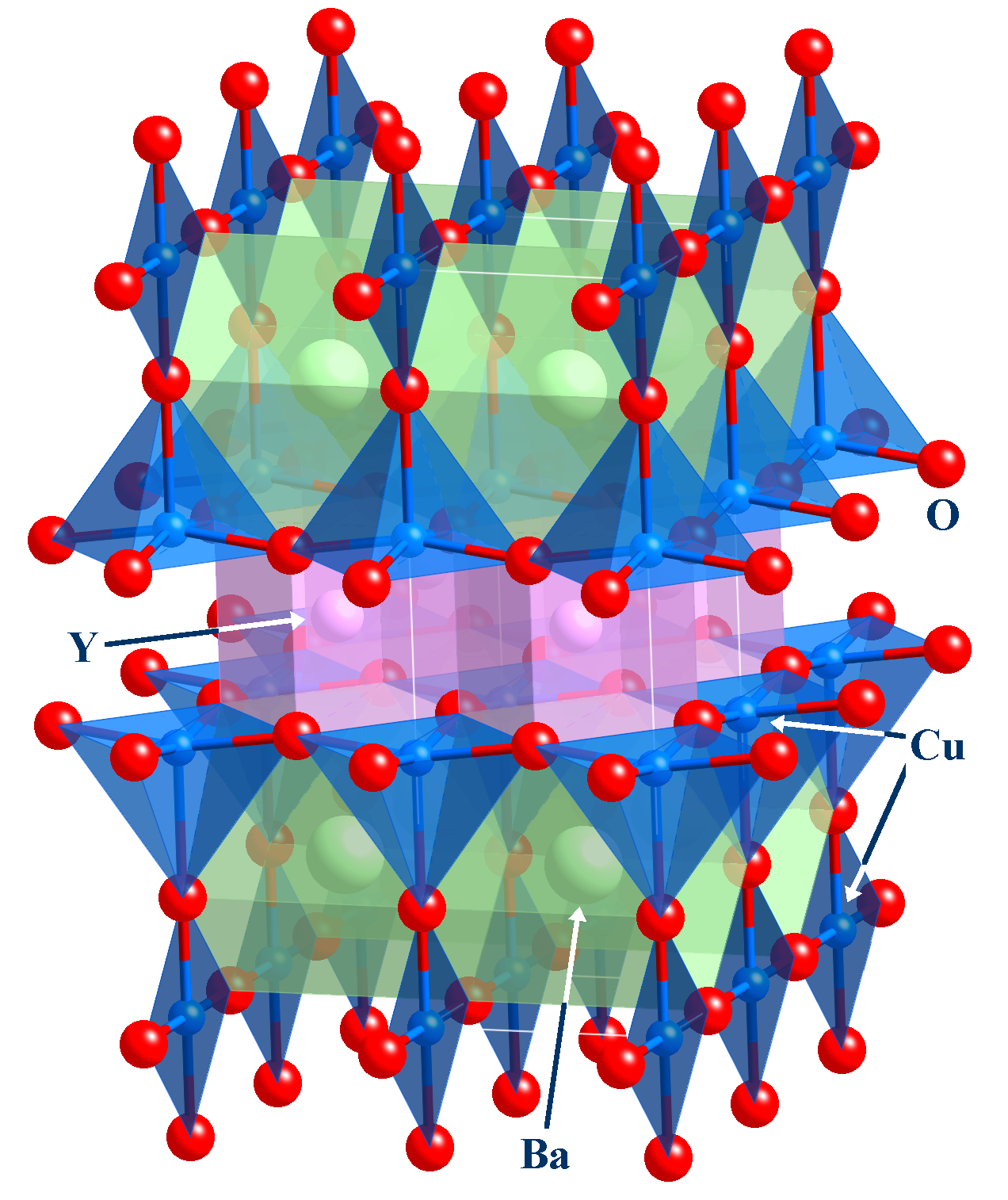
YBa_{2}Cu_{3}O_{7}, or YBCO, is a high temperature superconductor able to levitate above a magnet when colder than its critical temperature of about 90 K (−183 °C)

This important area focuses on structure, bonding, and the physical properties of materials. In practice, solid state inorganic chemistry uses techniques such as crystallography to gain an understanding of the properties that result from collective interactions between the subunits of the solid. Included in solid state chemistry are metals and their alloys or intermetallic derivatives. Related fields are condensed matter physics, mineralogy, and materials science.

- Examples: silicon chips, zeolites, YBa_{2}Cu_{3}O_{7}

== Spectroscopy and magnetism ==
In contrast to most organic compounds, many inorganic compounds are magnetic and/or colored. These properties provide information on the bonding and structure. The magnetism of inorganic compounds can be complex. For example, most copper(II) compounds are paramagnetic but Cu^{II}_{2}(OAc)_{4}(H_{2}O)_{2} is almost diamagnetic below room temperature. The explanation is due to magnetic coupling between pairs of Cu(II) sites in the acetate.

=== Qualitative theories ===
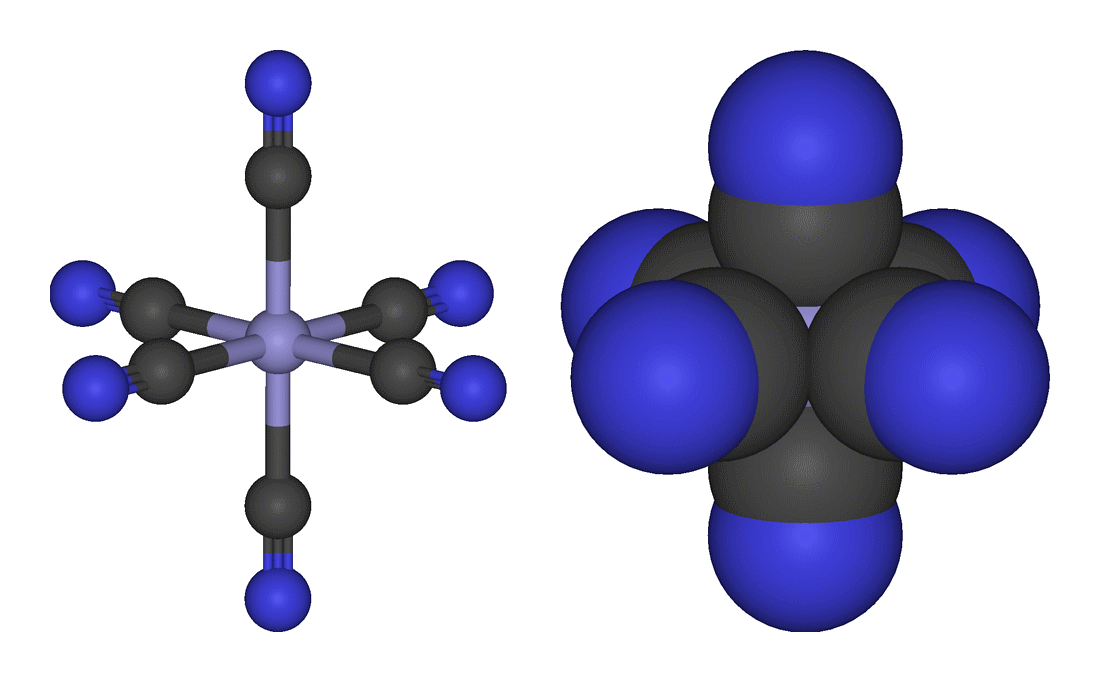
Crystal field theory explains why [Fe^{III}(CN)_{6}]^{3−} has only one unpaired electron

Inorganic chemistry has greatly benefited from qualitative theories. Such theories are easier to learn as they require little background in quantum theory. Within main group compounds, VSEPR theory powerfully predicts, or at least rationalizes, the structures of main group compounds, such as an explanation for why NH_{3} is pyramidal whereas ClF_{3} is T-shaped. For the transition metals, crystal field theory allows one to understand the magnetism of many simple complexes, such as why [Fe^{III}(CN)_{6}]^{3−} has only one unpaired electron, whereas [Fe^{III}(H_{2}O)_{6}]^{3+} has five. A particularly powerful qualitative approach to assessing the structure and reactivity begins with classifying molecules according to electron counting, focusing on the numbers of valence electrons, usually at the central atom in a molecule.

=== Molecular symmetry group theory ===
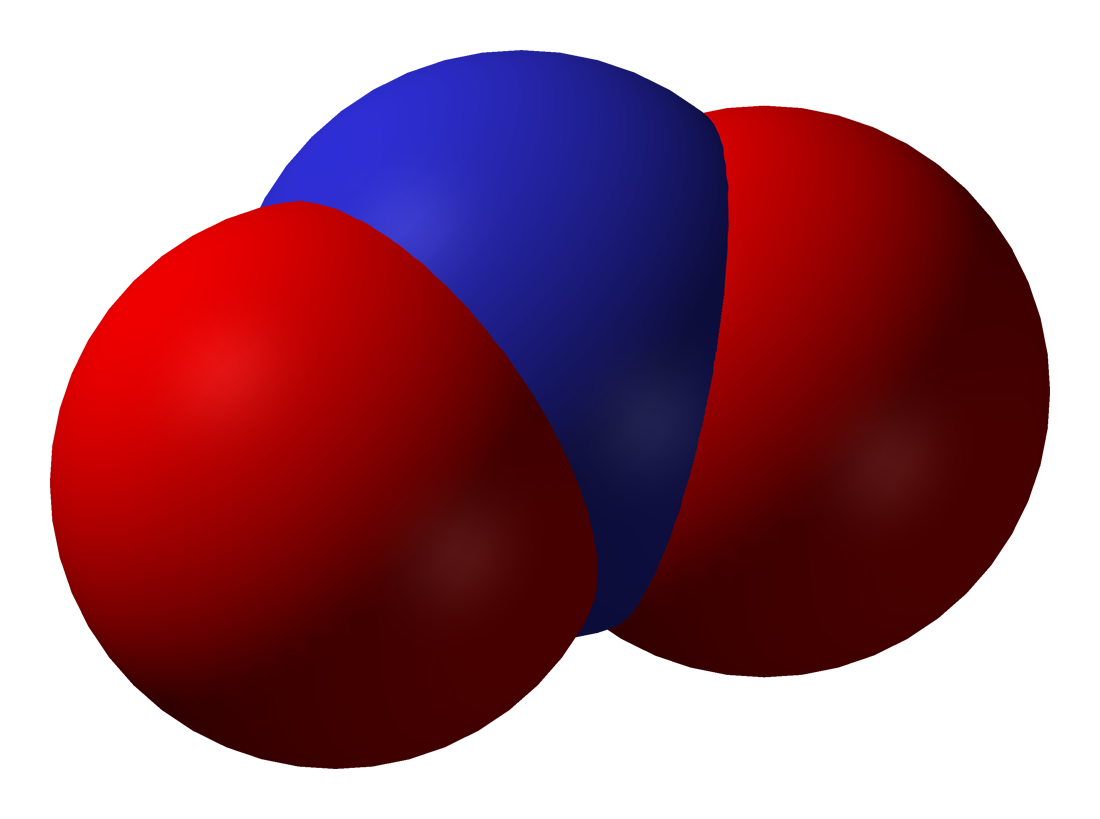
Nitrogen dioxide, NO_{2}, exhibits C_{2v} symmetry

A construct in chemistry is molecular symmetry, as embodied in Group theory. Inorganic compounds display a particularly diverse symmetries, so it is logical that Group Theory is intimately associated with inorganic chemistry. Group theory provides the language to describe the shapes of molecules according to their point group symmetry. Group theory also enables factoring and simplification of theoretical calculations.

Spectroscopic features are analyzed and described with respect to the symmetry properties of the, inter alia, vibrational or electronic states. Knowledge of the symmetry properties of the ground and excited states allows one to predict the numbers and intensities of absorptions in vibrational and electronic spectra. A classic application of group theory is the prediction of the number of C–O vibrations in substituted metal carbonyl complexes. The most common applications of symmetry to spectroscopy involve vibrational and electronic spectra.

Group theory highlights commonalities and differences in the bonding of otherwise disparate species. For example, the metal-based orbitals transform identically for WF_{6} and W(CO)_{6}, but the energies and populations of these orbitals differ significantly. A similar relationship exists between CO_{2} and molecular beryllium difluoride.

== Thermodynamics and inorganic chemistry ==
An alternative quantitative approach to inorganic chemistry focuses on energies of reactions. This approach is highly traditional and empirical, but it is also useful. Broad concepts that are couched in thermodynamic terms include redox potential, acidity, phase changes. A classic concept in inorganic thermodynamics is the Born–Haber cycle, which is used for assessing the energies of elementary processes such as electron affinity, some of which cannot be observed directly.

== Mechanistic inorganic chemistry ==
An important aspect of inorganic chemistry focuses on reaction pathways, i.e. reaction mechanisms.

=== Main group elements and lanthanides ===
The mechanisms of main group compounds of groups 13–18 are usually discussed in the context of organic chemistry (organic compounds are main group compounds, after all). Elements heavier than C, N, O, and F often form compounds with more electrons than predicted by the octet rule, as explained in the article on hypervalent molecules. The mechanisms of their reactions differ from organic compounds for this reason. Elements lighter than carbon (B, Be, Li) as well as Al and Mg often form electron-deficient structures that are electronically akin to carbocations. Such electron-deficient species tend to react via associative pathways. The chemistry of the lanthanides mirrors many aspects of chemistry seen for aluminium.

=== Transition metal complexes ===
Transition metal and main group compounds often react differently. The important role of d-orbitals in bonding strongly influences the pathways and rates of ligand substitution and dissociation. These themes are covered in articles on coordination chemistry and ligand. Both associative and dissociative pathways are observed.

An overarching aspect of mechanistic transition metal chemistry is the kinetic lability of the complex illustrated by the exchange of free and bound water in the prototypical complexes [M(H_{2}O)_{6}]^{n+}:

[M(H_{2}O)_{6}]^{n+} + 6 H_{2}O* → [M(H_{2}O*)_{6}]^{n+} + 6 H_{2}O
where H_{2}O* denotes isotopically enriched water, e.g., H_{2}^{17}O

The rates of water exchange varies by 20 orders of magnitude across the periodic table, with lanthanide complexes at one extreme and Ir(III) species being the slowest.

==== Redox reactions ====
Redox reactions are prevalent for the transition elements. Two classes of redox reaction are considered: atom-transfer reactions, such as oxidative addition/reductive elimination, and electron-transfer. A fundamental redox reaction is "self-exchange", which involves the degenerate reaction between an oxidant and a reductant. For example, permanganate and its one-electron reduced relative manganate exchange one electron:

[MnO_{4}]^{−} + [Mn*O_{4}]^{2−} → [MnO_{4}]^{2−} + [Mn*O_{4}]^{−}

==== Reactions at ligands ====
Coordinated ligands display reactivity distinct from the free ligands. For example, the acidity of the ammonia ligands in [Co(NH_{3})_{6}]^{3+} is elevated relative to NH_{3} itself. Alkenes bound to metal cations are reactive toward nucleophiles whereas alkenes normally are not. The large and industrially important area of catalysis hinges on the ability of metals to modify the reactivity of organic ligands. Homogeneous catalysis occurs in solution and heterogeneous catalysis occurs when gaseous or dissolved substrates interact with surfaces of solids. Traditionally homogeneous catalysis is considered part of organometallic chemistry and heterogeneous catalysis is discussed in the context of surface science, a subfield of solid state chemistry. But the basic inorganic chemical principles are the same. Transition metals, almost uniquely, react with small molecules such as CO, H_{2}, O_{2}, and C_{2}H_{4}. The industrial significance of these feedstocks drives the active area of catalysis. Ligands can also undergo ligand transfer reactions such as transmetalation.

== Characterization of inorganic compounds ==
Because of the diverse range of elements and the correspondingly diverse properties of the resulting derivatives, inorganic chemistry is closely associated with many methods of analysis. Older methods tended to examine bulk properties such as the electrical conductivity of solutions, melting points, solubility, and acidity. With the advent of quantum theory and the corresponding expansion of electronic apparatus, new tools have been introduced to probe the electronic properties of inorganic molecules and solids. Often these measurements provide insights relevant to theoretical models. Commonly encountered techniques are:

- X-ray crystallography: This technique allows for the 3D determination of molecular structures.
- Various forms of spectroscopy:
  - Ultraviolet-visible spectroscopy: Historically, this has been an important tool, since many inorganic compounds are strongly colored
  - NMR spectroscopy: Besides ^{1}H and ^{13}C many other NMR-active nuclei (e.g., ^{11}B, ^{19}F, ^{31}P, and ^{195}Pt) can give important information on compound properties and structure. The NMR of paramagnetic species can provide important structural information. Proton (^{1}H) NMR is also important because the light hydrogen nucleus is not easily detected by X-ray crystallography.
  - Infrared spectroscopy: Mostly for absorptions from carbonyl ligands
  - Electron nuclear double resonance (ENDOR) spectroscopy
  - Mössbauer spectroscopy
  - Electron-spin resonance: ESR (or EPR) allows for the measurement of the environment of paramagnetic metal centres.
- Electrochemistry: Cyclic voltammetry and related techniques probe the redox characteristics of compounds.

== Synthetic inorganic chemistry ==
Although some inorganic species can be obtained in pure form from nature, most are synthesized in chemical plants and in the laboratory.

Inorganic synthetic methods can be classified roughly according to the volatility or solubility of the component reactants. Soluble inorganic compounds are prepared using methods of organic synthesis. For metal-containing compounds that are reactive toward air, Schlenk line and glove box techniques are followed. Volatile compounds and gases are manipulated in "vacuum manifolds" consisting of glass piping interconnected through valves, the entirety of which can be evacuated to 0.001 mm Hg or less. Compounds are condensed using liquid nitrogen (b.p. 78 K) or other cryogens. Solids are typically prepared using tube furnaces, the reactants and products being sealed in containers, often made of fused silica (amorphous SiO_{2}) but sometimes more specialized materials such as welded Ta tubes or Pt "boats". Products and reactants are transported between temperature zones to drive reactions.

== See also ==
- Important publications in inorganic chemistry
