= Hexaborane(10) =

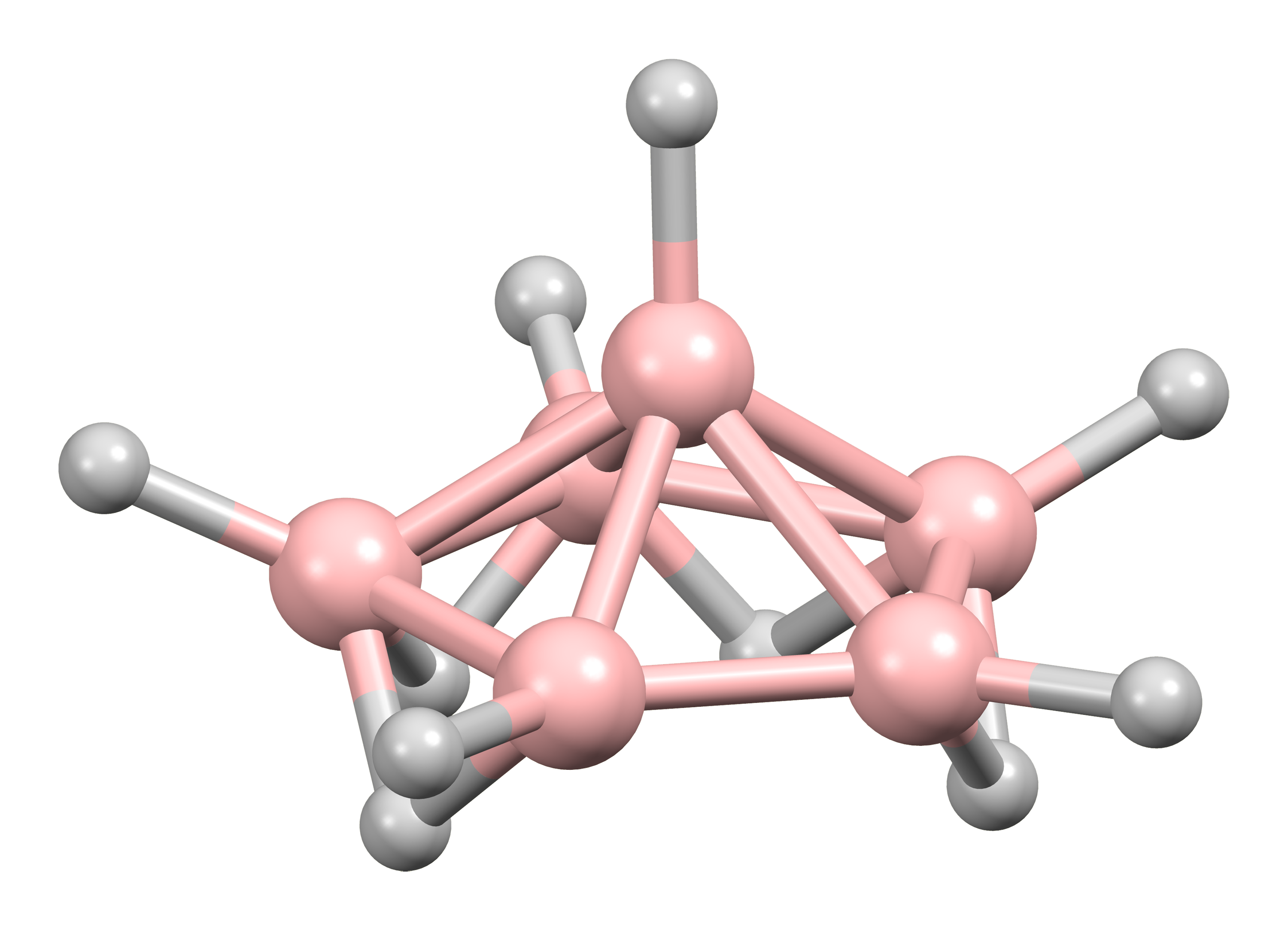

Identifiers
CAS Number	23777-80-2
3D model (JSmol)	Interactive image
- InChI: InChI=1S/B6H10/c7-1-2-3(1)4(1,7)6(3,9-4)5(2,3,8-2)10-6/h1-6H Key: RNDYOGWDQULVQP-UHFFFAOYSA-N
- SMILES: [BH]1234[BH]5([H]6)[BH]61([H]7)[BH]72([H]8)[BH]83([H]9)[BH]945

Properties
Chemical formula	B_{6}H_{10}
Molar mass	74.94 g·mol^{−1}
- Except where otherwise noted, data are given for materials in their standard state (at 25 °C [77 °F], 100 kPa). Infobox references

Hexaborane, also called hexaborane(10) to distinguish it from hexaborane(12) (B_{6}H_{12}), is a boron hydride cluster with the formula B_{6}H_{10}. It is a colorless liquid that is unstable in air.

== Structure ==
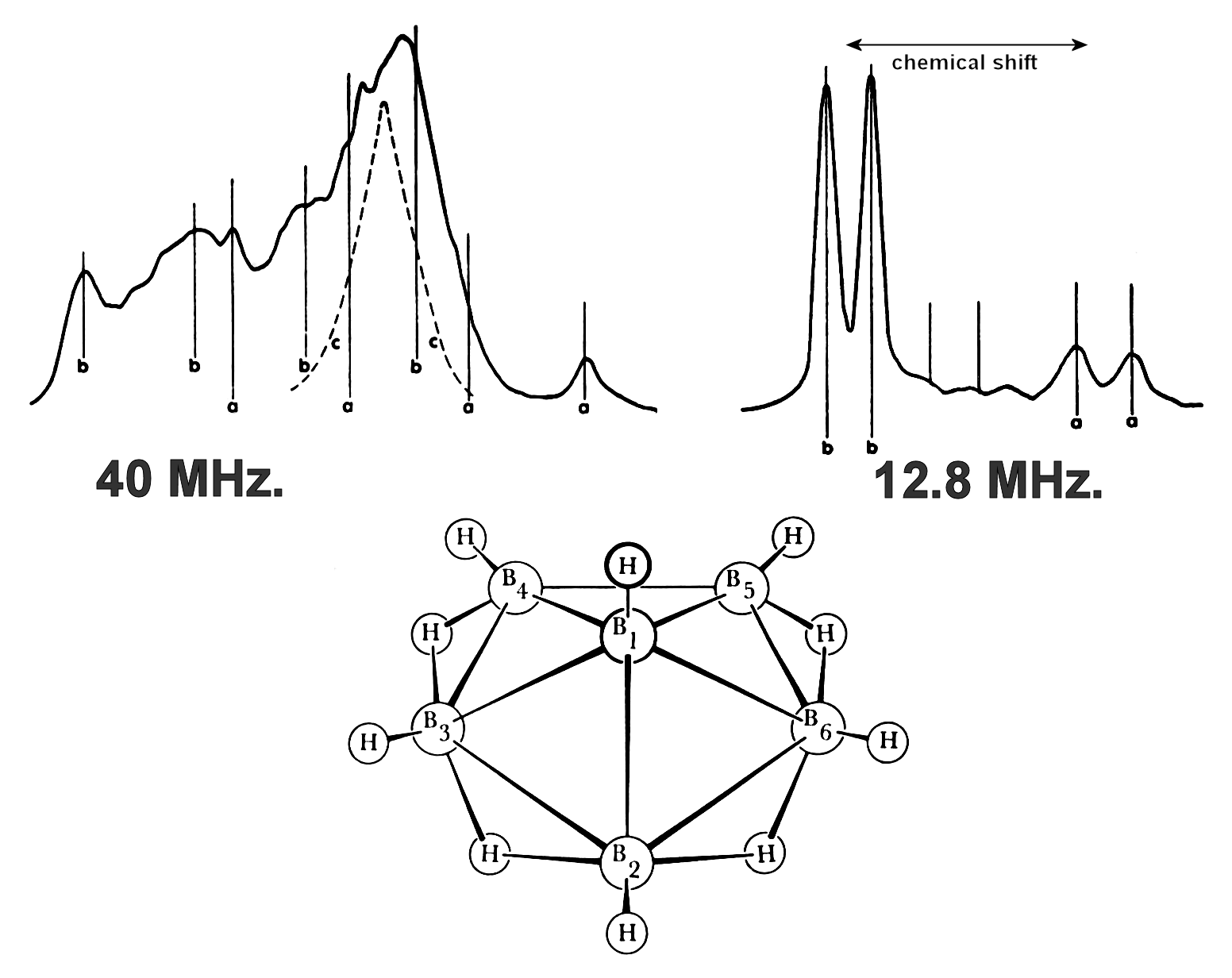
NMR interpretation of hexaborane(10), showing its structure

Hexaborane(10) is classified as a nido-cluster. The boron atoms define a pentagonal pyramid, with four bridging hydrogen atoms and six terminal ones. The point group of the molecule is C_{s}.

== Preparation and reactions ==
A laboratory route begins with bromination of pentaborane(11) followed by deprotonation of the bromide to give [BrB_{5}H_{7}]^{−}. This anionic cluster is reduced with diborane to give the neutral product:

K[BrB_{5}H_{7}] + 1/2 B_{2}H_{6} → KBr + B_{6}H_{10}

It can also be generated by pyrolysis of pentaborane(11).

B_{6}H_{10} can be deprotonated to give [B_{6}H_{9}]^{−} or protonated to give [B_{6}H_{11}]^{+}. It can act as a Lewis base towards reactive borane radicals, forming various conjuncto-clusters.
