= Tetraborane =

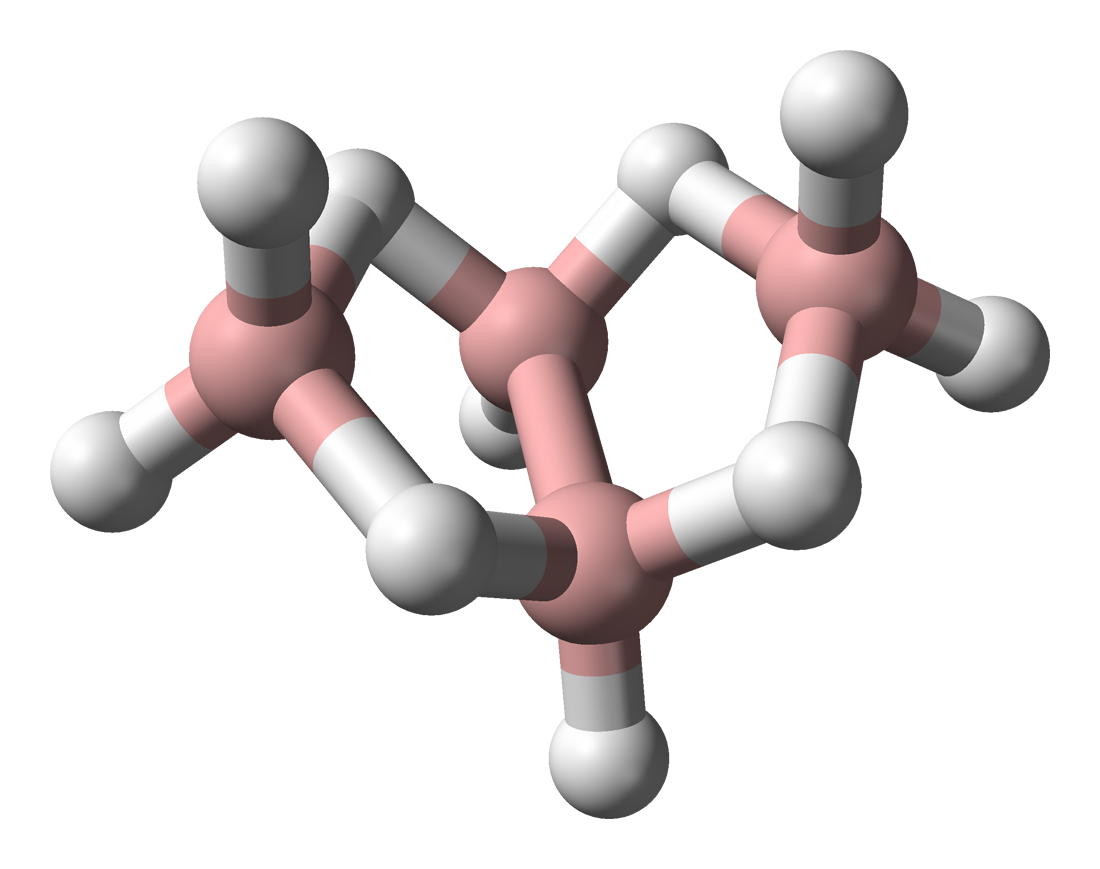
- ball-and-stick model of tetraborane

Names
- IUPAC names tetraborane(10) arachno-B_{4}H_{10}

Identifiers
CAS Number	18283-93-7
3D model (JSmol)	Interactive image
ChEBI	CHEBI:33592
ChemSpider	21865171
Gmelin Reference	49820
UNII	56X8JUK4Q7
CompTox Dashboard (EPA)	DTXSID101317104
- InChI: InChI=1S/B4H10/c5-1-3(5)2(7-3)4(1,3,6-1)8-2/h3-4H,1-2H2 Key: WEYOKDYZYYMRSQ-UHFFFAOYSA-N; InChI=1/B4H10/c5-1-3(5)2(7-3)4(1,3,6-1)8-2/h3-4H,1-2H2 Key: WEYOKDYZYYMRSQ-UHFFFAOYAQ
- SMILES: [H]B123([H])[H]B145([H])[H]B41([H])([H])[H]B215([H])[H]3

Properties
Chemical formula	B_{4}H_{10}
Molar mass	53.32 g/mol
Appearance	colourless gas
Density	2.3 kg m^{−3} (gas)
Melting point	−120.8 °C (−185.4 °F; 152.3 K)
Boiling point	18 °C (64 °F; 291 K)

Hazards
NFPA 704 (fire diamond)	4 4 3 W
- Except where otherwise noted, data are given for materials in their standard state (at 25 °C [77 °F], 100 kPa). verify (what is ?) Infobox references

Tetraborane (systematically named arachno-tetraborane(10)) was the first boron hydride compound to be discovered. It was classified by Alfred Stock and Carl Massenez in 1912 and was first isolated by Stock. It has a relatively low boiling point at 18 °C and is a gas at room temperature. Tetraborane gas is foul smelling, toxic and highly flammable.

== History ==
The class of boranes was elucidated using X-ray diffraction analysis by Lipscomb et al. in the 1950s. The X-ray data indicated two-electron multicenter bonds. Later, analysis based on high-resolution X-ray data was performed to analyze the charge density.

== Structure ==
Like other boron hydride clusters, the structure of tetraborane involves multicenter bonding, with hydrogen bridges or protonated double bonds. According to its formula, B_{4}H_{10}, it is classified as an arachno-cluster and has a butterfly geometry, which can be rationalized by Wade's rules. Each boron is sp^{3} hybridized, and “the configuration of the three hydrogens surrounding borons B1 and B3 is approximately trigonal and suggests approximately tetrahedral hybridization for these borons which would predict bond angles of 120°.” However, the boron arrangements can be classified as fragments of either the icosahedron or the octahedron because the bond angles are actually between 105° and 90°.

The comparison of the diffraction data from X-ray diffraction and electron diffraction gave suspected bond lengths and angles: B1—B2 = 1.84 Å, B1—B3= 1.71 Å, B2—B1—B4= 98 ̊, B—H = 1.19 Å, B1—Hμ = 1.33 Å, B2—Hμ =1.43 Å.

== Preparation ==
Tetraborane can be produced via a reaction between acid and magnesium or beryllium borides, with smaller quantities from aluminum, manganese, and cerium borides. Hydrolysis of magnesium boride, hydrogenation of boron halides at high temperatures and the pyrolysis of diborane also produce tetraborane. The hydrolysis of magnesium boride was one of the first reactions to give a workable yield (14%) of tetraborane. Phosphoric acid proved to be the most efficient acid (compared to hydrochloric and sulfuric acid) in the reaction with magnesium boride.

Alternatively, boron trihalides metathesize with arachno-triborate(8) (B_{3}H^{−}_{8}) salts to give tetraborane and a hydridotrihaloborate salt with yields near 50%.

== Isomers ==
Scientists are working to produce the bis(diboranyl) isomer of the arachno-tetraborane structure. The bis(diboranyl) is expected to have a lower energy at the Hartree-Fock method (HF) level. There is some evidence that the bis(diboranyl) isomer is initially produced when synthesizing tetraborane by the Wurtz reaction or coupling of B_{2}H_{5}I in the presence of sodium amalgam. Three pathways of conversion from the bis(diboranyl) isomer into the arachno-tetraborane structure have been constructed computationally.

Path 1: Dissociative pathway via B_{3}H_{7} and BH_{3}
Path 2: Concerted pathway over two transition states separated by a local minimum
Path 3: Another concerted pathway involving penta-coordinated isomers as intermediates

Paths 2 and 3 are more likely, because they are more energetically favored with energies of 33.1 kcal/mol and 22.7 kcal/mol respectively.

== Safety ==
Because it is easily oxidized it must be kept under vacuum. Tetraborane ignites when it comes in contact with air, oxygen, and nitric acid. Boranes in general including tetraborane have been deemed very toxic and are biologically destructive. A study consisting of small daily exposure of the chemical to rabbits and rats resulted in fatality.
