= Brellochs reaction =

In organoboron chemistry, the Brellochs reaction provides a way to generate the monocarboranes. The Brellochs method uses formaldehyde to insert single carbon atoms into boron hydrides.

Illustrative is the synthesis of CB_{9}H_{14}^{−} from commercially available decaborane.

B_{10}H_{14} + CH_{2}O + 2 OH^{−} + H_{2}O → CB_{9}H_{14}^{−} + B(OH)_{4}^{−} + H_{2}

Oxidation of the arachno anion gives nido-6-CB_{9}H_{12}^{−}. Base degradation of the latter gives arachno-4-CB_{8}H_{14}.
