= Boron hydride clusters =

Chemical compound composed of boron and hydrogen atoms only

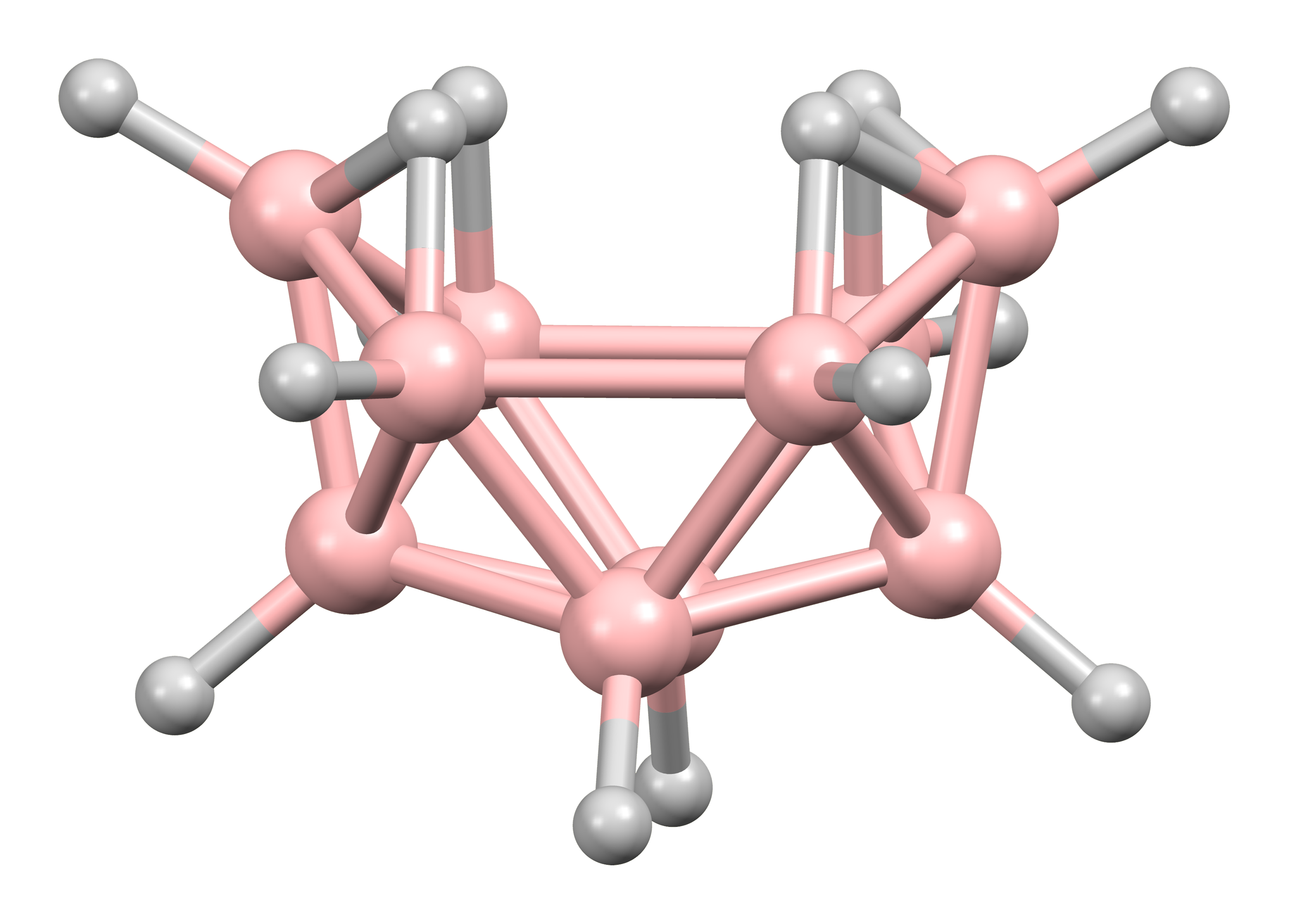
Decaborane(14), B_{10}H_{14}

Boron hydride clusters are inorganic compounds with the formula B_{x}H_{y} or related anions, where x ≥ 3. Many such cluster compounds are known. Tetraborane was the first borane cluster to be discovered but common examples are those with 5, 10, and 12 boron atoms. Although they have few practical applications, the borane hydride clusters exhibit structures and bonding that differs strongly from the patterns seen in hydrocarbons. Hybrids of boranes and hydrocarbons, the carboranes, are also well developed.

== History ==
The development of the borane hydride clusters resulted from pioneering work by Alfred Stock, invented the glass vacuum line for their study. The structures of the boron hydride clusters were determined beginning in 1948 with the characterization of decaborane. William Lipscomb was awarded the Nobel Prize in Chemistry in 1976 for this and many subsequent crystallographic investigations. These investigations revealed the prevalence of deltahedral structures, i.e., networks of triangular arrays of BH centers.

The bonding of the clusters ushered in Polyhedral skeletal electron pair theory and Wade's rules, which can be used to predict the structures of boranes. These rules were found to describe structures of many cluster compounds.

== Chemical formula and naming conventions ==
Borane clusters are classified as follows, where n is the number of boron atoms in a single cluster:

Cluster type	Chemical formula	Example	Notes
hypercloso-	B_{n}H_{n}		Unstable; derivatives are known
closo-	[B_{n}H_{n}]^{2−}	Caesium dodecaborate	
nido-	B_{n}H_{n+4}	pentaborane(9)	
arachno-	B_{n}H_{n+6}	pentaborane(11)	
hypho-	B_{n}H_{n+8}		Only found in adducts

The International Union of Pure and Applied Chemistry rules for systematic naming is based on a prefix denoting a class of compound, followed by the number of boron atoms and finally the number of hydrogen atoms in parentheses. Various details can be omitted if there is no ambiguity about the meaning, for example, if only one structural type is possible. Some examples of the structures are shown below.

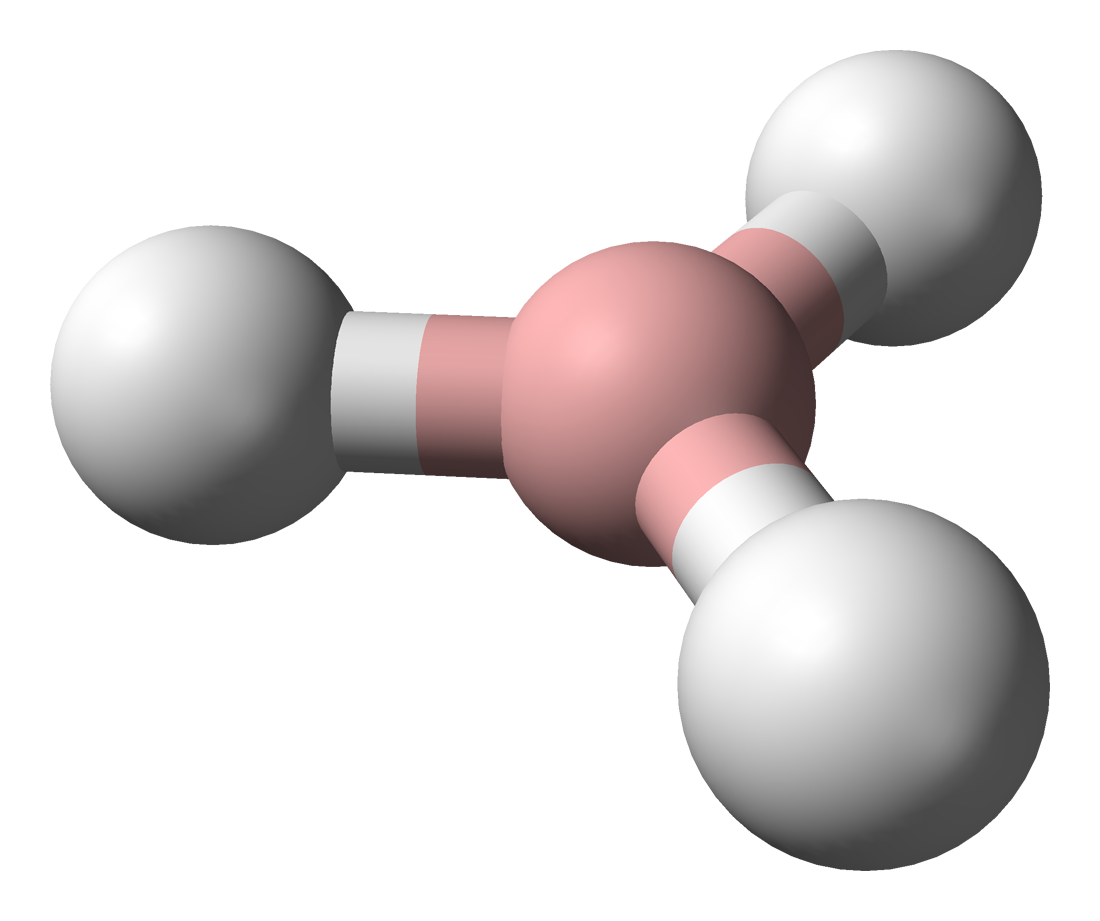
Borane
BH_{3}

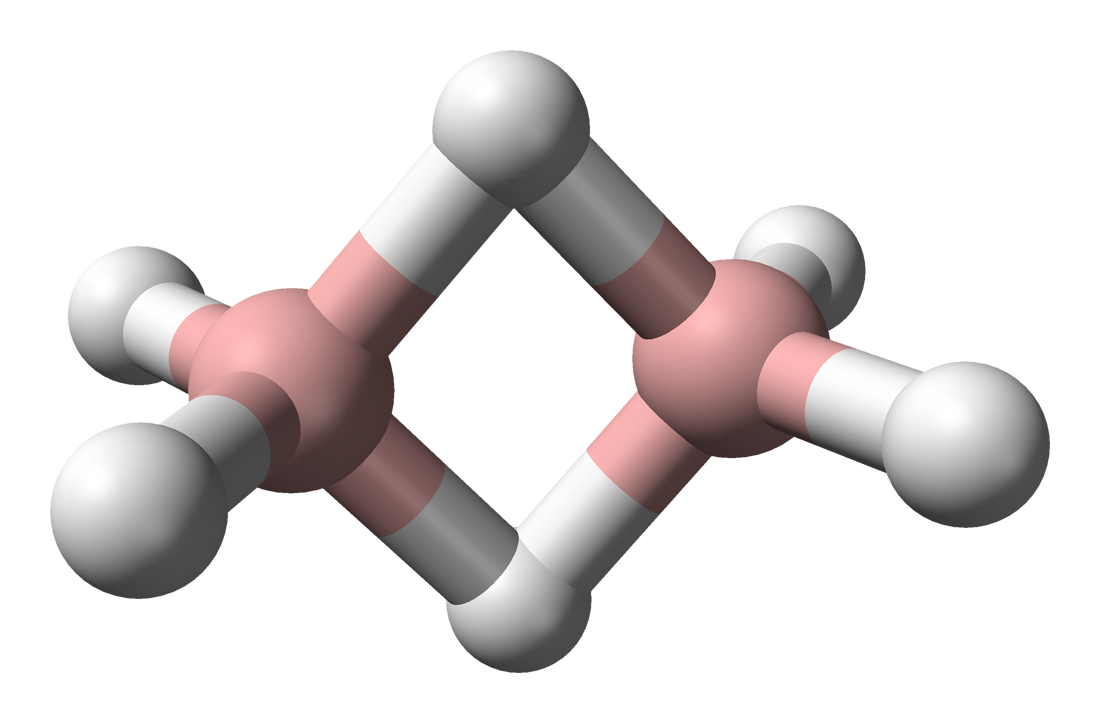
Diborane(6)
B_{2}H_{6}

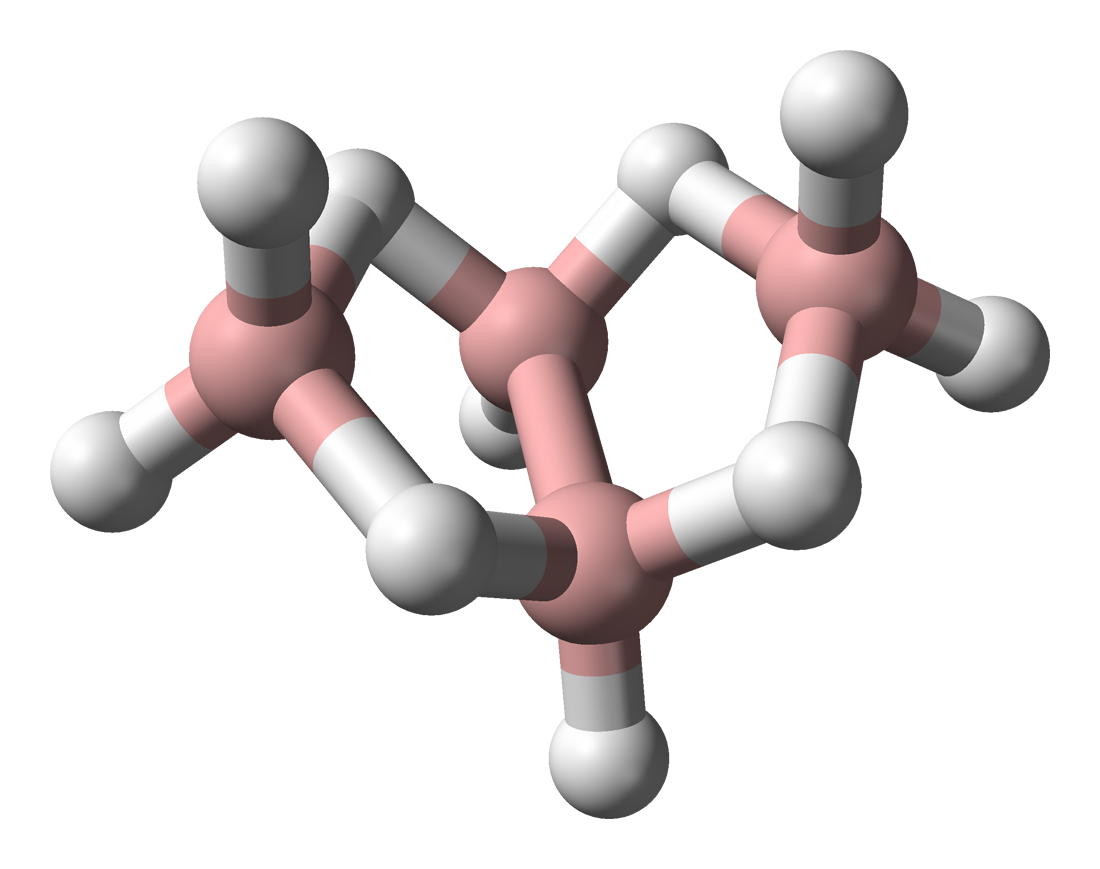
arachno-Tetraborane(10)
B_{4}H_{10}

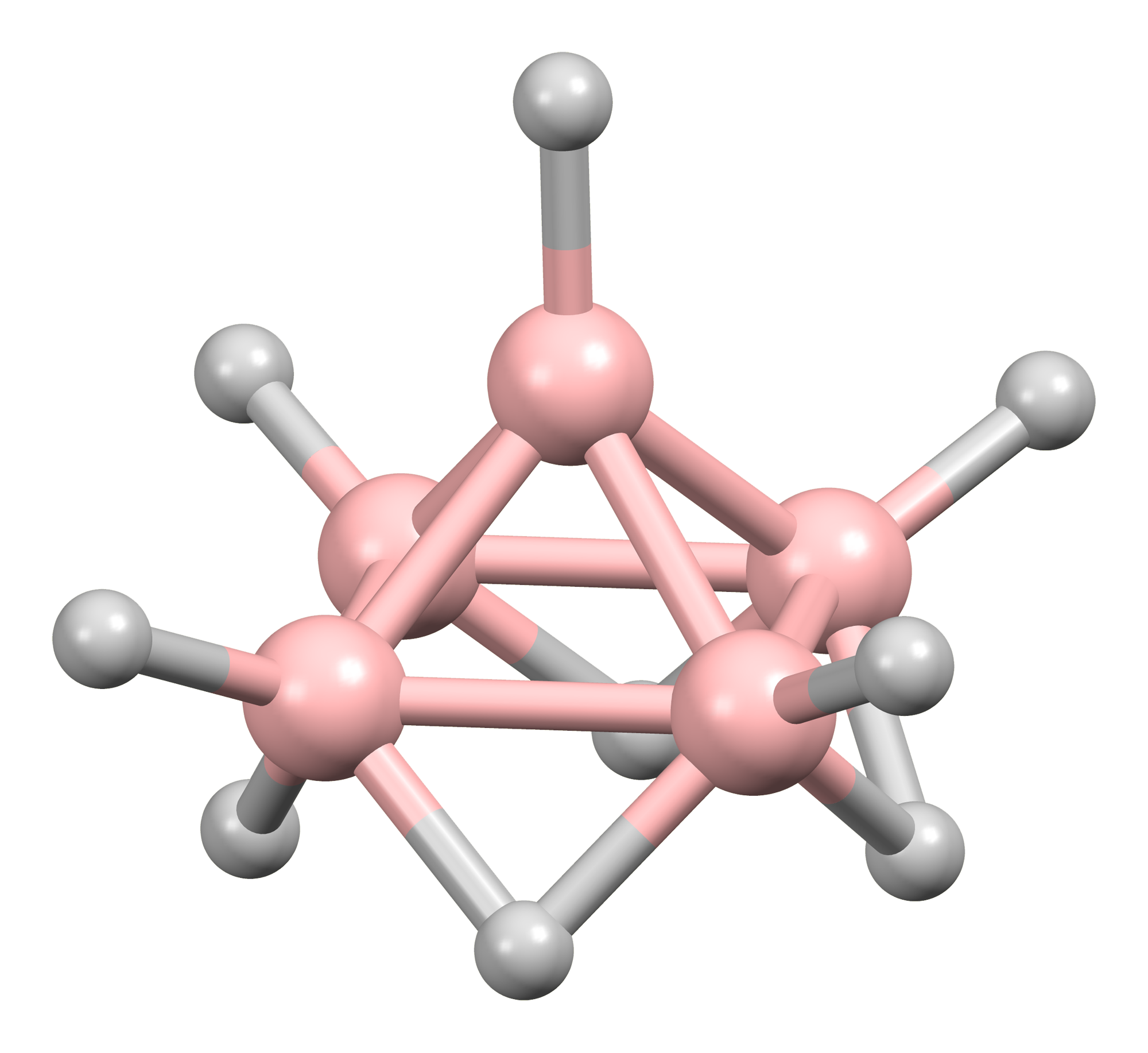
Pentaborane(9)
B_{5}H_{9}

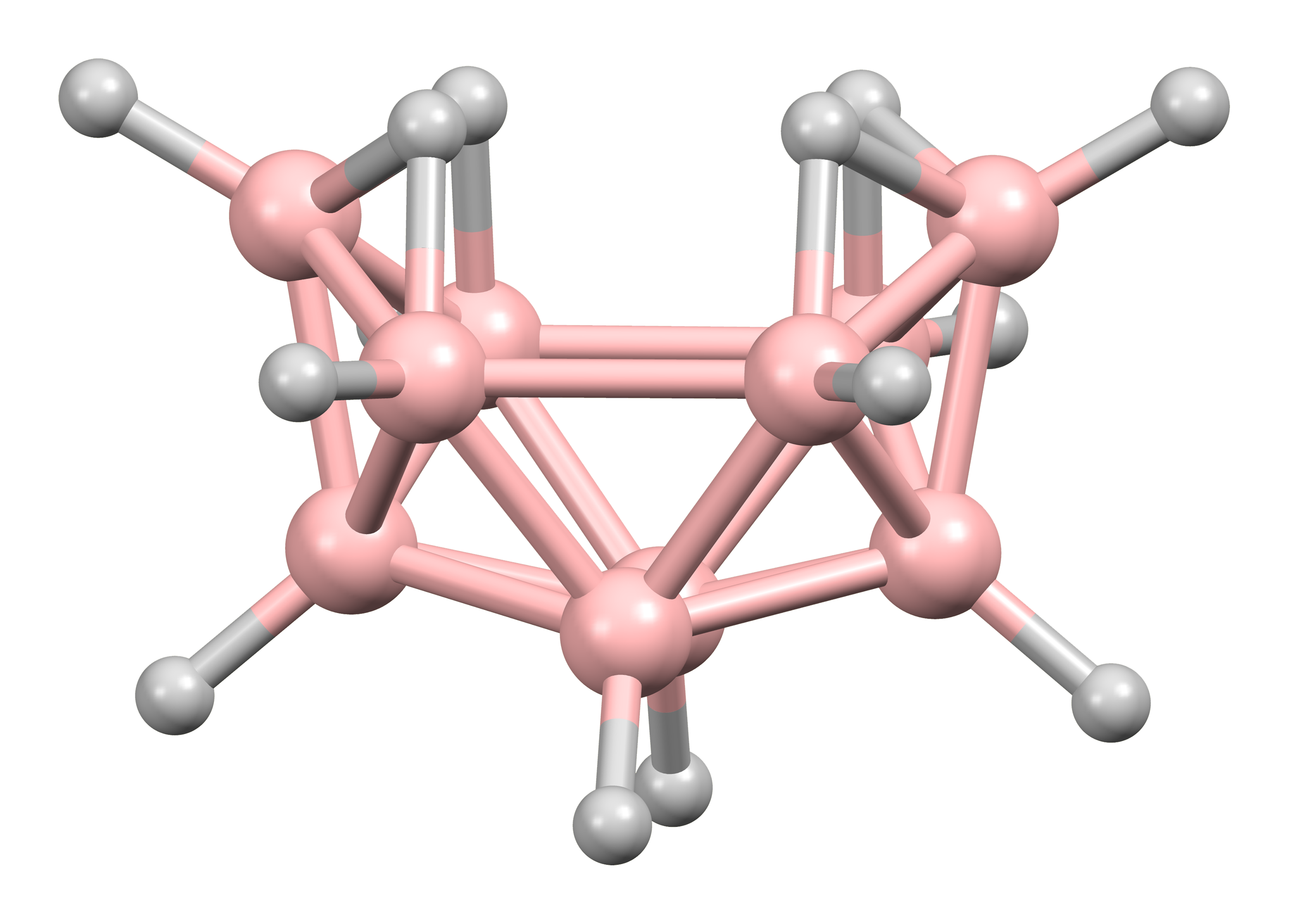
Decaborane(14)
B_{10}H_{14}

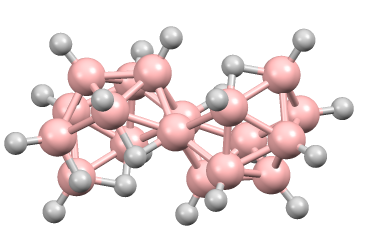
Octadecaborane(22)
B_{18}H_{22}

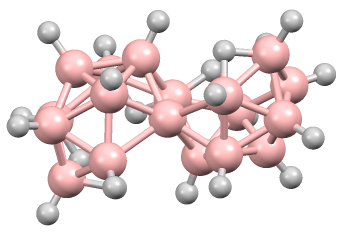
iso-B_{18}H_{22}
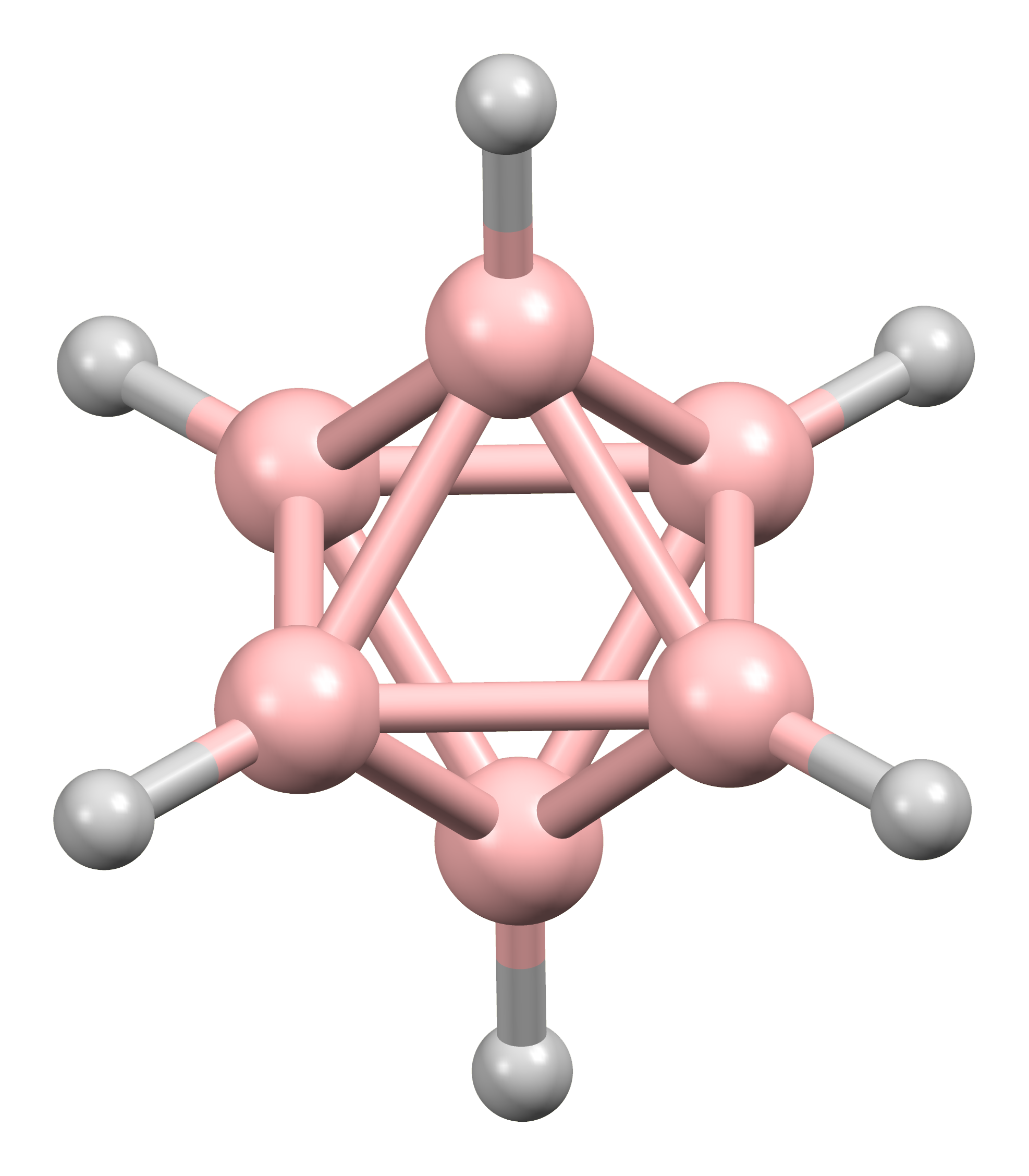
Hexaborate(6)
[B_{6}H_{6}]^{2−}

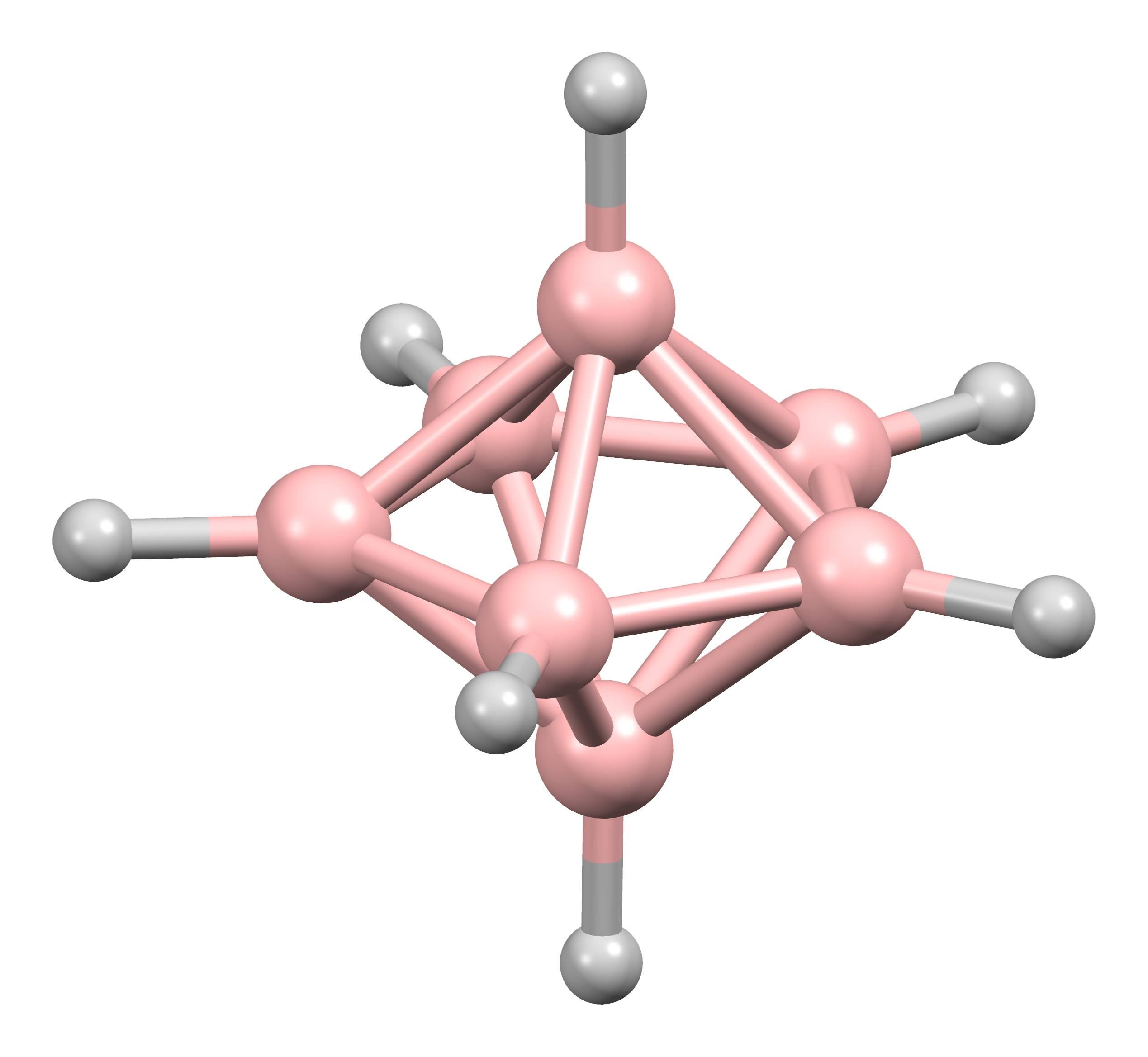
Heptaborate(7)
[B_{7}H_{7}]^{2−}

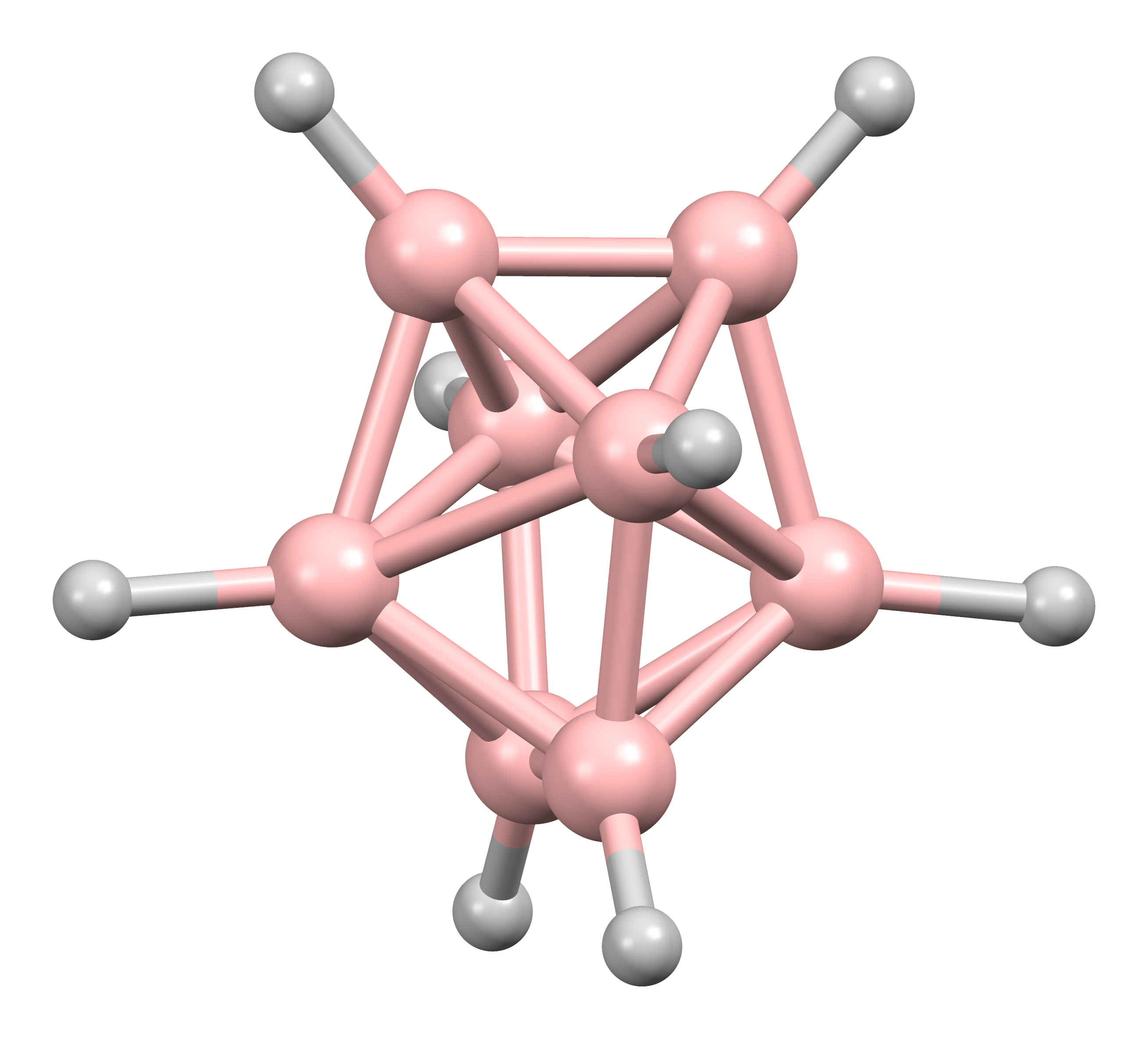
Octaborate(8)
[B_{8}H_{8}]^{2−}

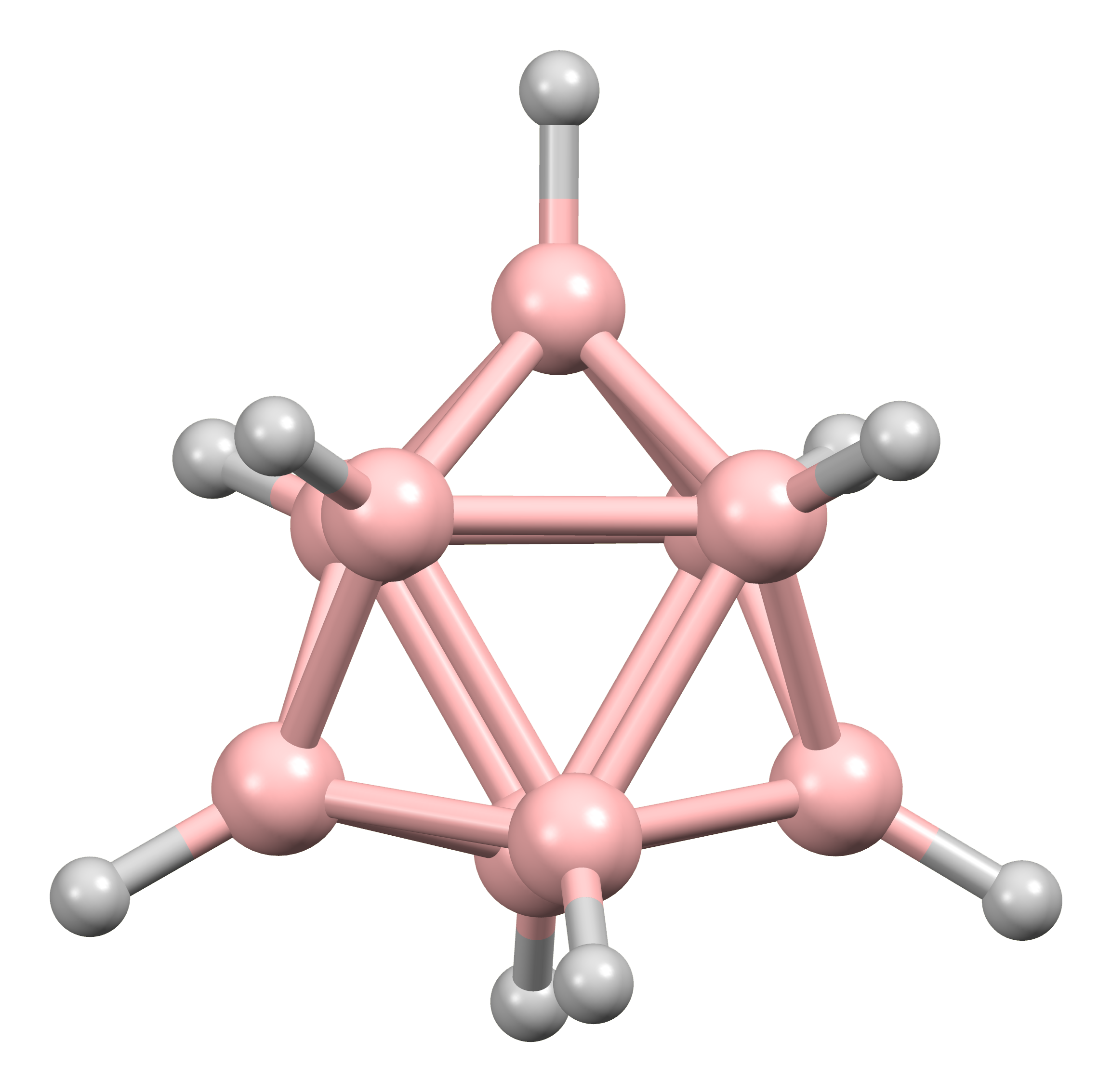
Nonaborate(9)
[B_{9}H_{9}]^{2−}

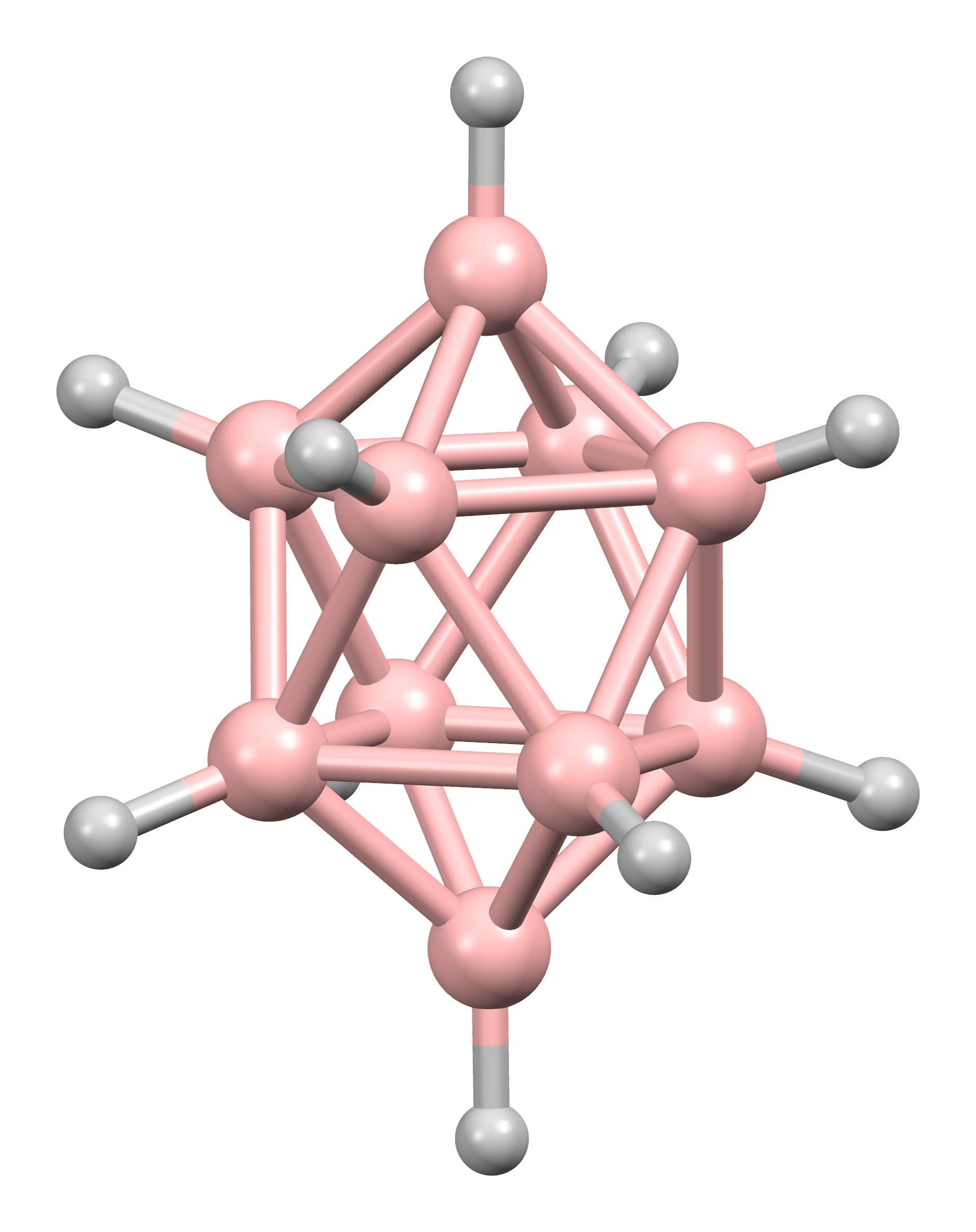
Decaborate(10)
[B_{10}H_{10}]^{2−}

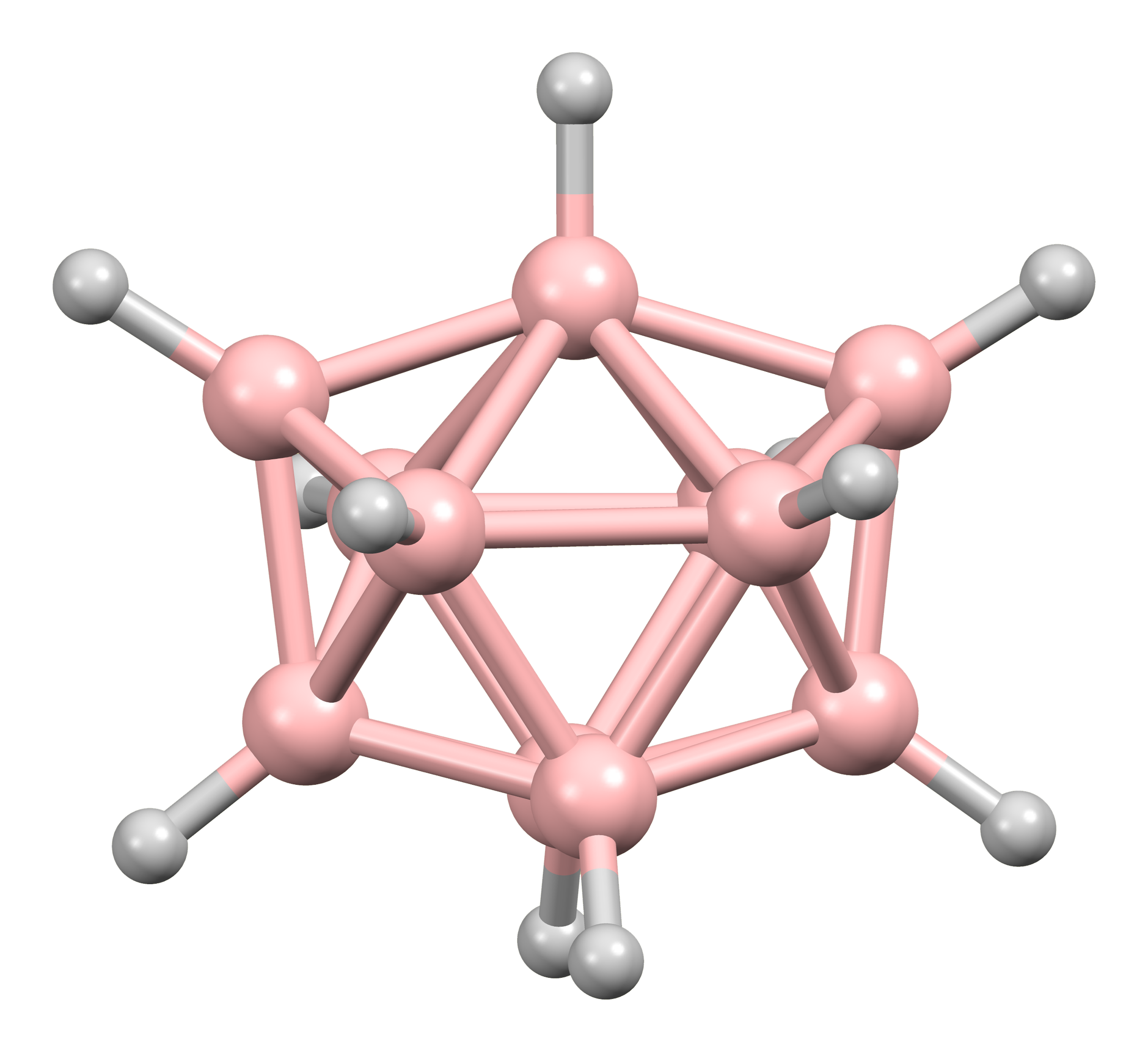
Undecaborate(11)
[B_{11}H_{11}]^{2−}

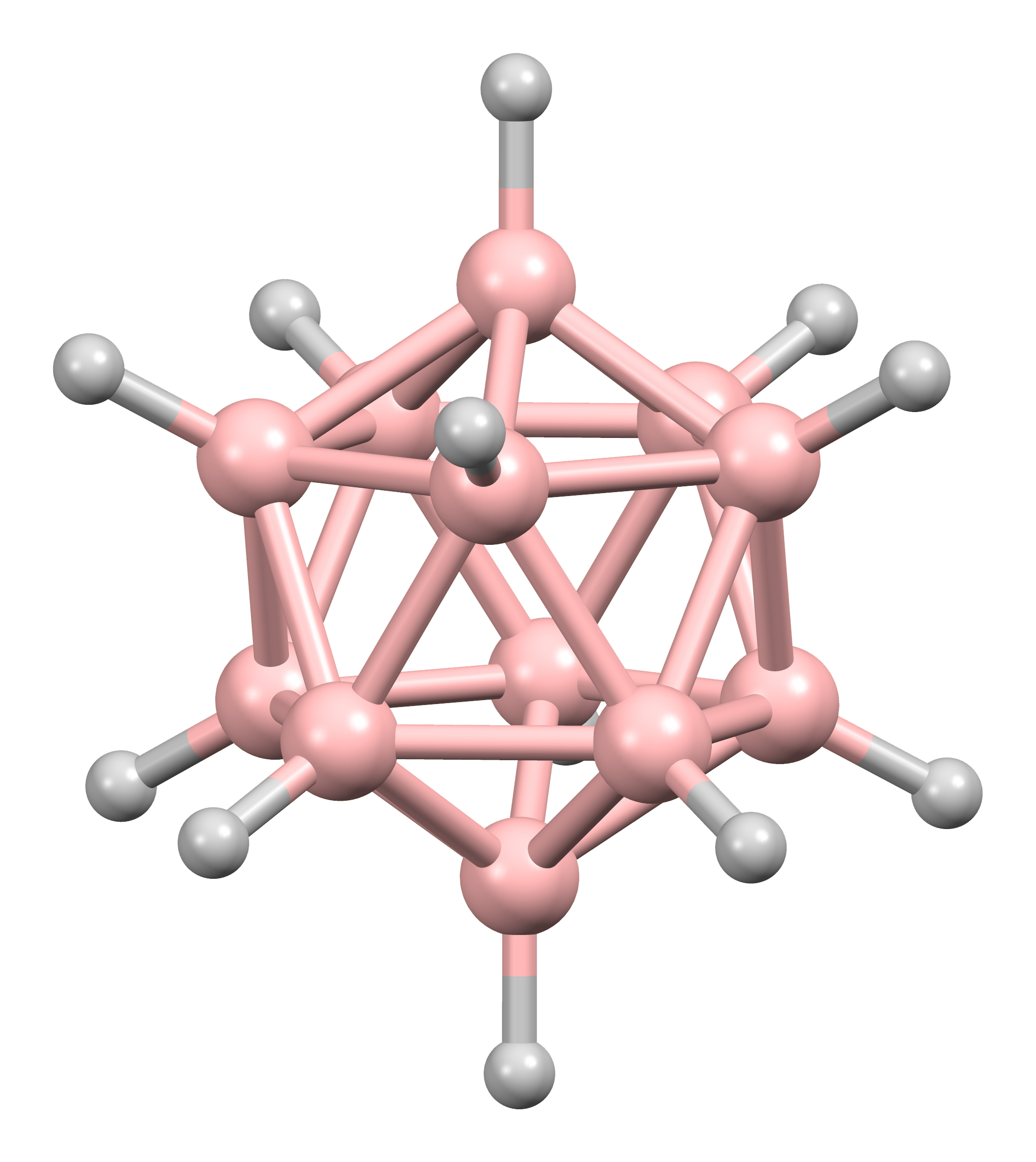
Dodecaborate(12)
[B_{12}H_{12}]^{2−}

The naming of anions is illustrated by

octahydridopentaborate, [B_{5}H_{8}]^{−}

The hydrogen count is specified first followed by the boron count. The -ate suffix is applied with anions. The ionic charge value is included in the chemical formula but not as part of the systematic name.

== Bonding in boranes ==
Boranes are nonclassically–bonded compounds, that is, there are not enough electrons to form 2-centre, 2-electron bonds between all pairs of adjacent atoms in the molecule. A description of the bonding in the larger boranes was formulated by William Lipscomb. It involved:

- 3-center 2-electron B-H-B hydrogen bridges
- 3-center 2-electron B-B-B bonds
- 2-center 2-electron bonds (in B-B, B-H and BH_{2})

Lipscomb's methodology has largely been superseded by a molecular orbital approach. This allows the concept of multi-centre bonding to be extended. For example, in the icosahedral ion [B_{12}H_{12}]^{2−}, the totally symmetric (A_{g} symmetry) molecular orbital is equally distributed among all 12 boron atoms. Wade's rules provide a powerful method that can be used to rationalize the structures in terms of the number of atoms and the connectivity between them.

=== Multicluster boranes ===
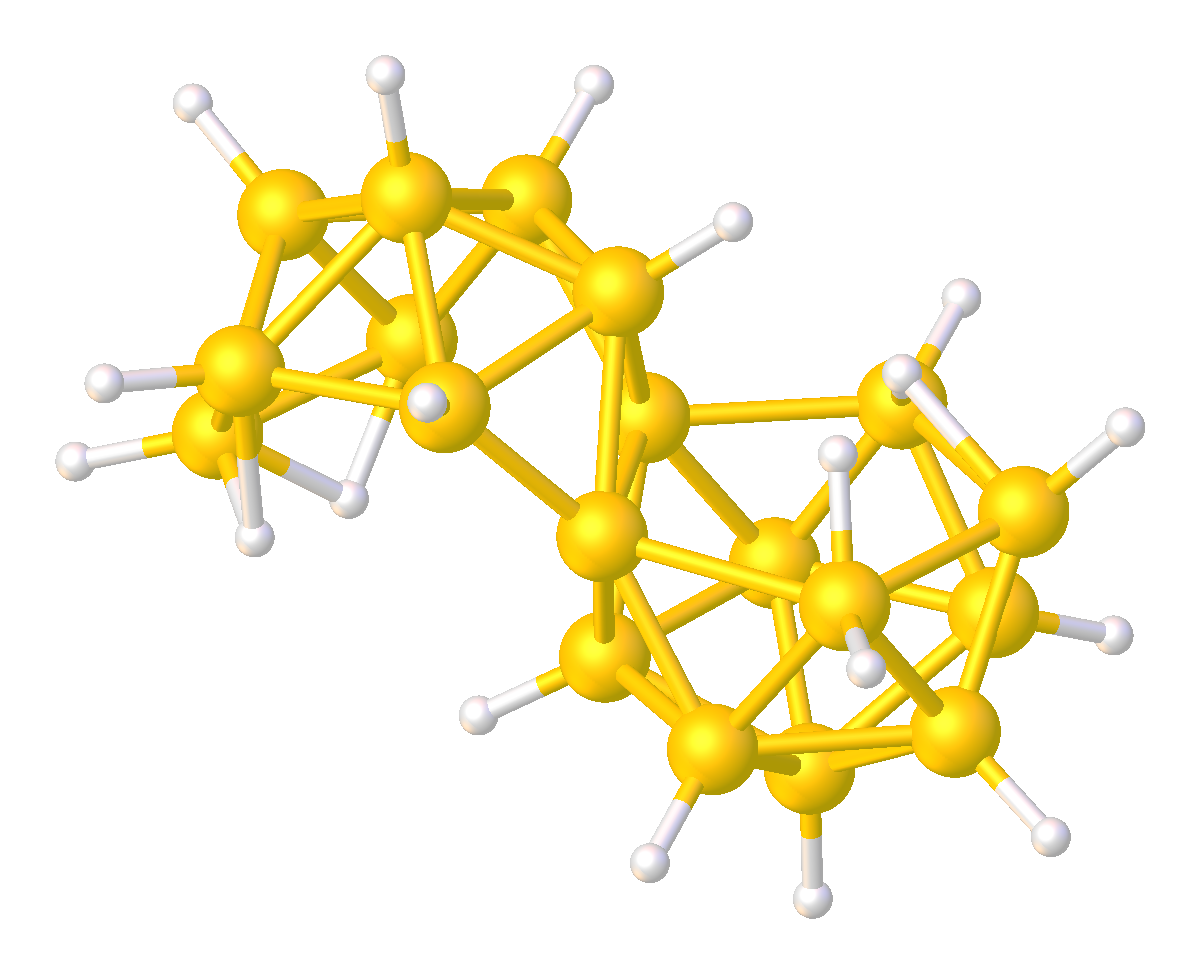
Structure of the conjuncto boron hydride cluster [B_{19}H_{22}]^{−}.

Although relatively rare, several multi-cluster boranes have been characterized. For example, reaction of a borane cluster with B_{2}H_{6} (as a source of BH_{3}) can lead to the formation of a conjuncto-borane species in which borane cluster sub-units are joined by the sharing of boron atoms.

B_{6}H_{10} + "BH_{3}" → B_{7}H_{11} + H_{2}
B_{7}H_{11} + B_{6}H_{10} → B_{13}H_{19} + H_{2}

Other conjuncto-boranes, where the sub-units are joined by a B-B bond, can be made by ultra violet irradiation of nido-boranes. Some B-B coupled conjuncto-boranes can be produced using PtBr_{2} as catalyst.

Analogous to Wade's Rules, electron counting scheme has been developed to predict or rationalize multicluster boranes.

Multi-cluster descriptors
Prefix	Meaning	Example
klado-	branched clusters	
conjuncto-	conjoined clusters	
megalo-	multiple conjoined clusters	

=== Lewis acid/base behavior ===
Some function as electron donors owing to the relative basic character of the B−H_{terminal} groups. Boranes can function as ligands in coordination compounds. Hapticities of η^{1} to η^{6} have been found, with electron donation involving bridging H atoms or donation from B-B bonds. For example, nido-B_{6}H_{10} can replace ethene in Zeise's salt to produce trans-Pt(η^{2}-B_{6}H_{10})Cl_{2}.

They can also act as Lewis acids, with concomitant opening of the cluster. An example involving trimethylphosphine:

B_{5}H_{9} + 2 P(CH_{3})_{3} → B_{5}H_{9}·2P(CH_{3})_{3}

=== Brønsted acid/base behavior ===
Some higher boranes, especially those with bridging hydrogen atoms, can be deprotonated with a strong base. An example:

B_{5}H_{9} + NaH → Na[B_{5}H_{8}] + H_{2}

Acidity increases with the size of the borane, with B_{10}H_{14} having a pK_{a} value of 2.7:

B_{5}H_{9} < B_{6}H_{10} < B_{10}H_{14} < B_{16}H_{20} < B_{18}H_{22}

In general, bridging hydrogen protons tend to be lost before terminal ones.

=== Aufbau reactions ===
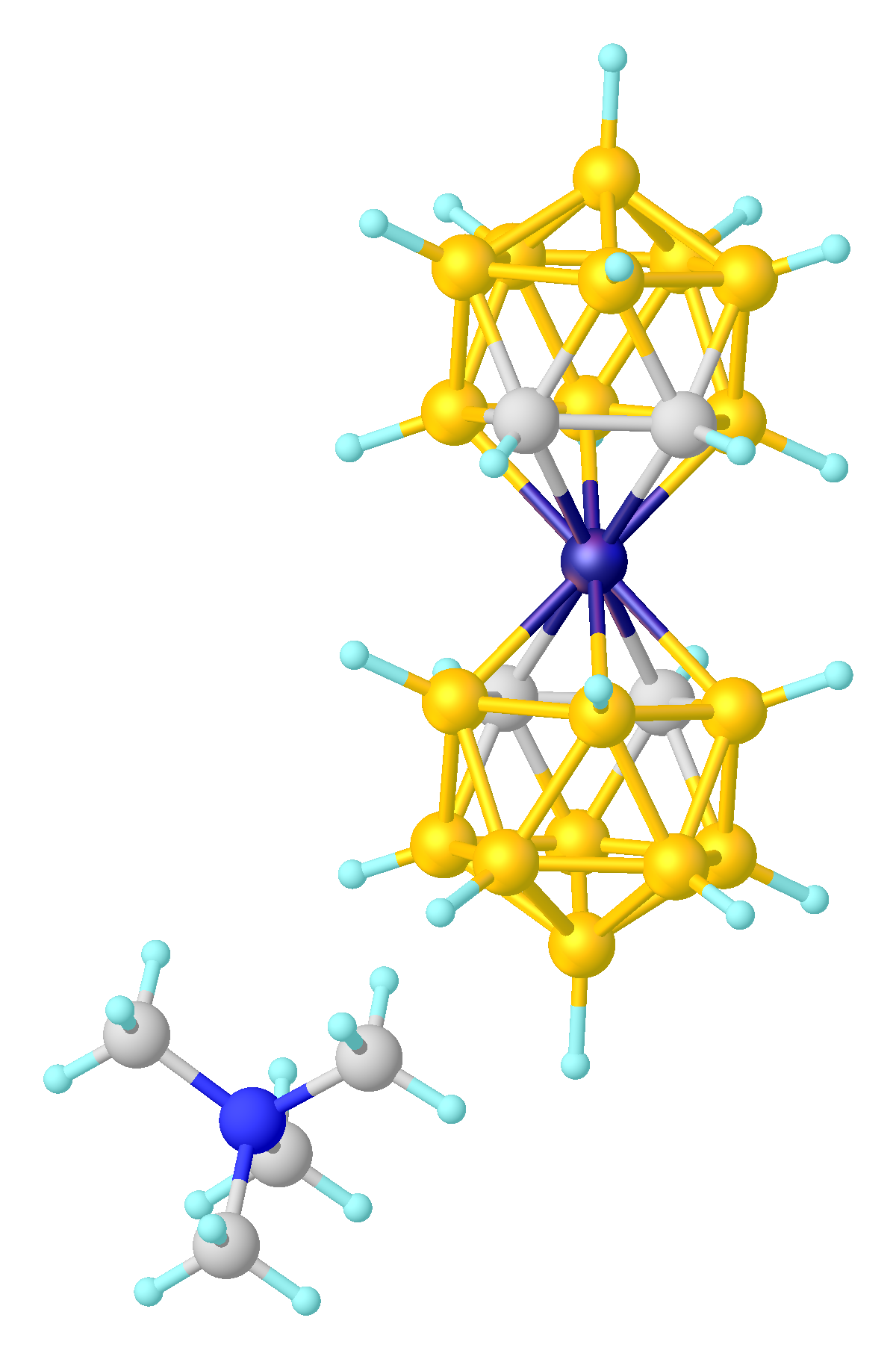
Structure of [(CH_{3})_{4}N^{+}]_{2}[Fe(C_{2}B_{9}H_{11})_{2}]^{+}, showing only one Me_{4}N^{+}.

For the boron hydride chemist, one of the most important reactions is the building up process by which smaller boron hydride clusters add borane to give larger clusters. This approach also applies to the synthesis of metallaboranes,

=== Hydroboration ===
Reminiscent of the behavior of diborane and its adducts, higher boranes participate in hydroboration. When boron hydrides add an alkyne, the carbon becomes incorporated into the cluster, producing carboranes, e.g. C_{2}B_{10}H_{12}.

== Applications ==
Some cobalt derivatives of carboranes have been commercialized for sequestering ^{137}Cs from radioactive waste.

Boranes have a high specific energy of combustion compared to hydrocarbons, making them potentially attractive as fuels or igniters. Intense research was carried out in the 1950s into their use as jet fuel additives, but the effort did not lead to practical results.

=== Aspirational uses ===
Because ^{10}B has a very high neutron-capture cross section, boron-hydride derivatives have often been investigated for applications in Neutron capture therapy of cancer.

^{10}B + ^{1}n → (^{11}B*) → ^{4}He + ^{7}Li + γ (2.4 Mev)

== See also ==
- Category:Boranes, containing all specific borane-compound articles
