= Hexaborane(12) =

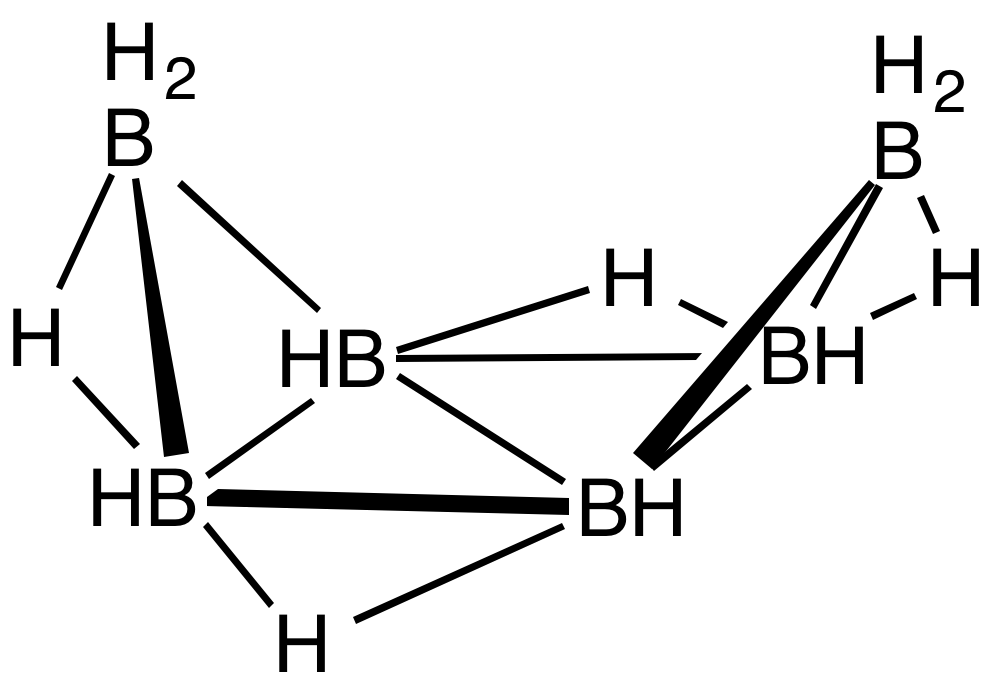

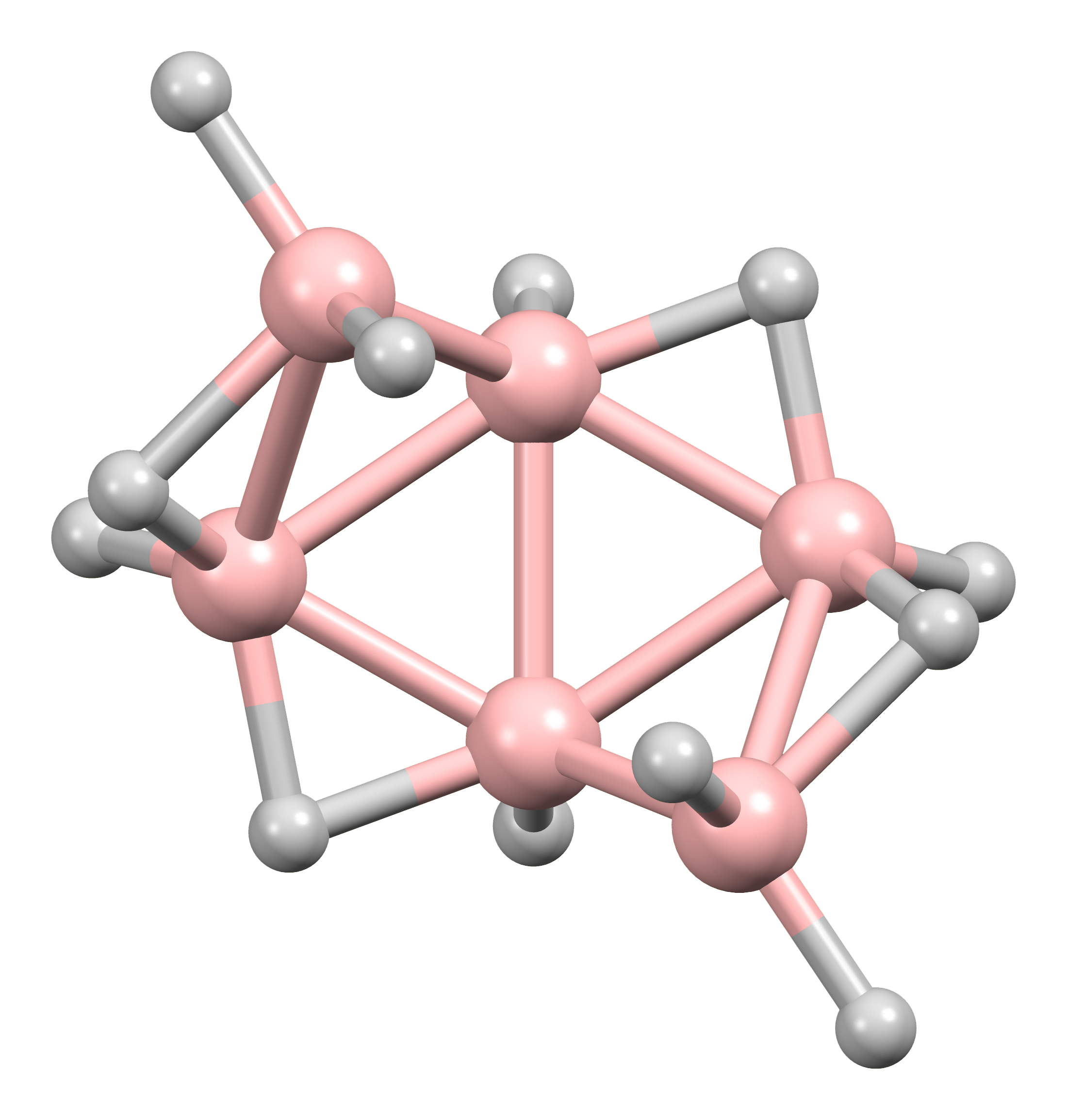

Identifiers
| CAS Number | 12008-19-4 |
| 3D model (JSmol) | Interactive image |
- InChI: InChI=1S/B6H12/c7-1-3-4(5(1,3,7)10-4)2-6(3,4,8-2)9-3/h3-6H,1-2H2 Key: ZMLJCODVOXNMHE-UHFFFAOYSA-N
- SMILES: [BH2]12[BH]34([H]1)[BH]256[BH]38([H]4)[BH]75([H]6)[BH2]8[H]7

Properties
| Chemical formula | B_{6}H_{12} |
| Molar mass | 76.96 g·mol^{−1} |
| Appearance | colorless liquid |
| Melting point | −82.3 °C (−116.1 °F; 190.8 K) |
| Boiling point | 85 °C (185 °F; 358 K) (approx) |
- Except where otherwise noted, data are given for materials in their standard state (at 25 °C [77 °F], 100 kPa). Infobox references

Hexaborane(12) is an inorganic compound with the formula B_{6}H_{12}. It is an obscure member of the boranes. It is a colorless liquid that, like some other boron hydride clusters, is readily hydrolyzed and flammable.

The molecular structure conforms to C_{2} symmetry group. With the formula B_{n}H_{n+6}, it is classified as an arachno-cluster. As such the boron positions match six of the boron positions in the closo-B_{8}H^{2−}_{8}.

== Preparation ==
It is typically prepared by the cluster expansion method from B_{5}H^{−}_{8}, the conjugate base of pentaborane(9):

LiB_{5}H_{8} + 1/2 B_{2}H_{6} → LiB_{6}H_{11}
LiB_{6}H_{11} + HCl → B_{6}H_{12} + LiCl
