= Decaborane =

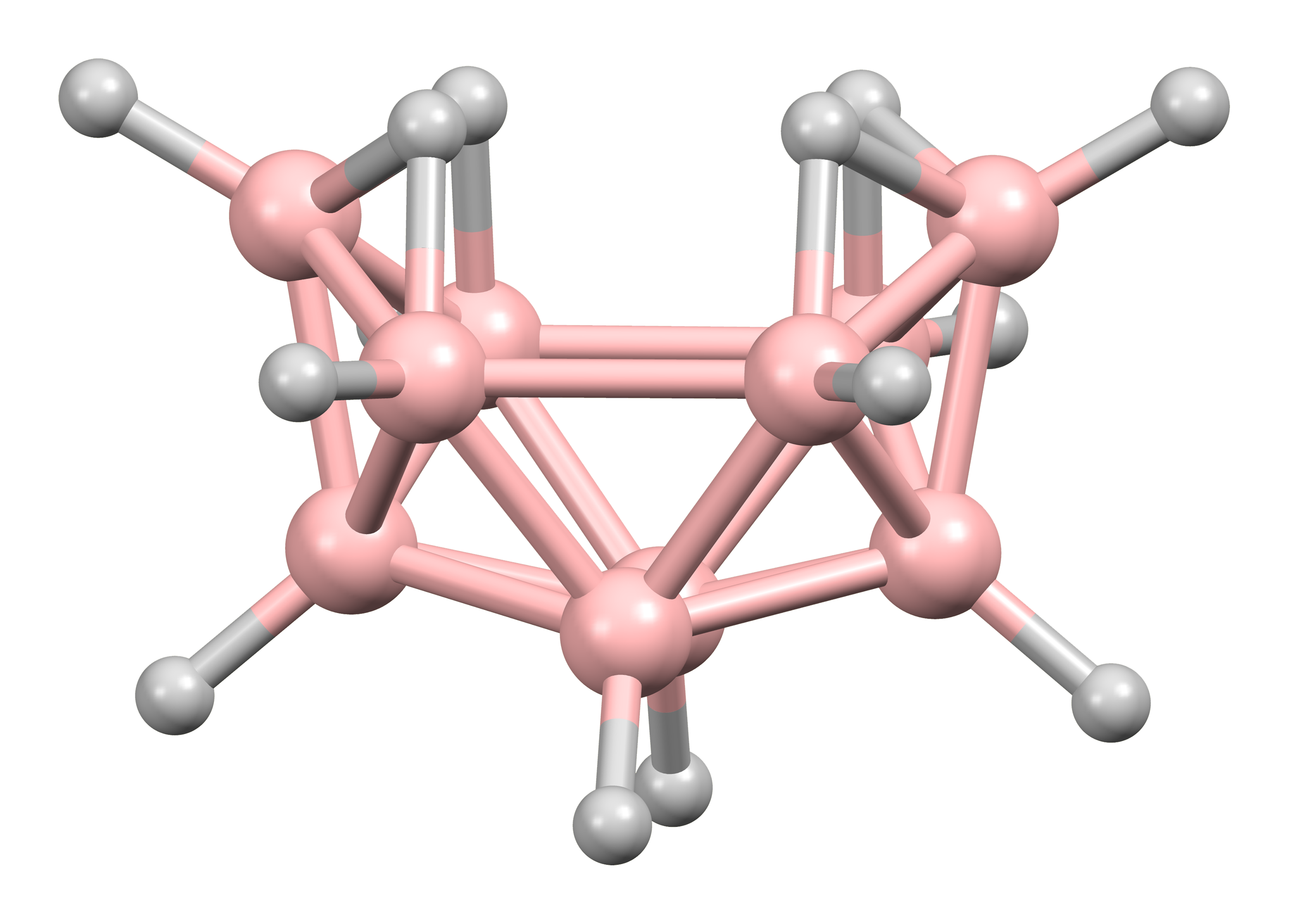
- The three-dimensional structure of decaborane

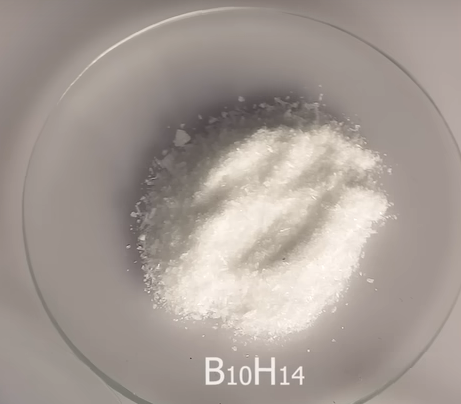

Names
- Other names decaborane decaboron tetradecahydride

Identifiers
CAS Number	17702-41-9
3D model (JSmol)	Interactive image
ChemSpider	21241886
ECHA InfoCard	100.037.904
EC Number	241-711-8
PubChem CID	6328162
UNII	4O04290A2J
CompTox Dashboard (EPA)	DTXSID80880049
- InChI: InChI=1S/B10H14/c11-5-1-2-3(1,5)7(2,9(3,5,11)13-7)8(2)4(1,2)6(1,5)10(4,8,12-6)14-8/h1-10H Key: XAMMYYSPUSIWAS-UHFFFAOYSA-N; InChI=1/B10H14/c11-5-1-2-3(1,5)7(2,9(3,5,11)13-7)8(2)4(1,2)6(1,5)10(4,8,12-6)14-8/h1-10H Key: XAMMYYSPUSIWAS-UHFFFAOYAD
- SMILES: [H]1[BH]234[BH]156[BH]278[BH]39([H]4)[BH]712[BH]853[BH]645[BH]311[BH]922[BH]14([H]5)[H]2

Properties
Chemical formula	B_{10}H_{14}
Molar mass	122.22 g/mol
Appearance	White crystals
Odor	bitter, chocolate-like or burnt rubber
Density	0.94 g/cm^{3}
Melting point	97–98 °C (207–208 °F; 370–371 K)
Boiling point	213 °C (415 °F; 486 K)
Solubility in other solvents	Slightly, in cold water.
Vapor pressure	0.2 mmHg

Hazards
- Occupational safety and health (OHS/OSH)
Main hazards	may ignite spontaneously on exposure to air
- GHS labelling
Pictograms	(GHS02: Flammable) (GHS06: Toxic) (GHS07: Exclamation mark) (GHS08: Health hazard)
Signal word	Danger
Hazard statements	H228, H301, H310, H316, H320, H330, H335, H336, H370, H372
Precautionary statements	P210, P240, P241, P260, P262, P264, P270, P271, P280, P284, P301+P310, P302+P350, P304+P340, P305+P351+P338, P307+P311, P310, P312, P314, P320, P321, P330, P332+P313, P337+P313, P361, P363, P370+P378, P403+P233, P405, P501
NFPA 704 (fire diamond)	3 2 2 W
Flash point	80 °C; 176 °F; 353 K
Autoignition temperature	149 °C (300 °F; 422 K)
- Lethal dose or concentration (LD, LC)
LC_{50} (median concentration)	276 mg/m^{3} (rat, 4 hr); 72 mg/m^{3} (mouse, 4 hr); 144 mg/m^{3} (mouse, 4 hr)
- NIOSH (US health exposure limits)
PEL (Permissible)	TWA 0.3 mg/m^{3} (0.05 ppm) [skin]
REL (Recommended)	TWA 0.3 mg/m^{3} (0.05 ppm) ST 0.9 mg/m^{3} (0.15 ppm) [skin]
IDLH (Immediate danger)	15 mg/m^{3}
- Except where otherwise noted, data are given for materials in their standard state (at 25 °C [77 °F], 100 kPa). verify (what is ?) Infobox references

Decaborane, also called decaborane(14), is the inorganic compound with the chemical formula B_{10}H_{14}. It is classified as a borane and more specifically a boron hydride cluster. This white crystalline compound is one of the principal boron hydride clusters, both as a reference structure and as a precursor to other boron hydrides. It is toxic and volatile, giving off a foul odor, like that of burnt rubber or chocolate.

== Handling, properties and structure ==
The physical characteristics of decaborane(14) resemble those of naphthalene and anthracene, all three of which are volatile colorless solids. Sublimation is the common method of purification. Decaborane is highly flammable, and burns with a bright green flame like other boron hydrides. It is not sensitive to moist air, although it hydrolyzes in boiling water, releasing hydrogen and giving a solution of boric acid. It is soluble in cold water as well as a variety of non-polar and moderately polar solvents.

In decaborane, the B_{10} framework resembles an incomplete octadecahedron. Each boron atom has one "radial" hydride, and four boron atoms near the open part of the cluster feature extra bridging hydrides. In the language of cluster chemistry, the structure is classified as "nido".

== Synthesis and reactions ==
It is commonly synthesized via the pyrolysis of smaller boron hydride clusters. For example, pyrolysis of B_{2}H_{6} or B_{5}H_{9} gives decaborane, with loss of H_{2}. On a laboratory scale, sodium borohydride is treated with boron trifluoride to give NaB_{11}H_{14}, which is acidified to release borane and hydrogen gas.

It reacts with Lewis bases (L) such as CH_{3}CN and Et_{2}S, to form adducts:

B_{10}H_{14} + 2 L → B_{10}H_{12}L_{2} + H_{2}

These species, which are classified as "arachno" clusters, in turn react with acetylene to give the "closo" ortho-carborane:

B_{10}H_{12} · 2 L + C_{2}H_{2} → C_{2}B_{10}H_{12} + 2 L + H_{2}

Decaborane(14) is a weak Brønsted acid. Monodeprotonation generates the anion [B_{10}H_{13}]^{−}, with again a nido structure.

In the Brellochs reaction, decaborane is converted to arachno-CB_{9}H^{−}_{14}:

B_{10}H_{14} + CH_{2}O + 2 OH^{−} + H_{2}O → CB_{9}H^{−}_{14} + B(OH)^{−}_{4} + H_{2}

== Possible applications ==
Decaborane has no significant commercial applications, although the compound has often been investigated. It and its derivatives were investigated as an additive to special high-performance rocket fuels. Its derivatives were investigated as well, e.g. ethyl decaborane.

Decaborane is an effective reagent for the reductive amination of ketones and aldehydes.

Decaborane has been assessed for low energy ion implantation of boron in the manufacture of semiconductors. It has also been considered for plasma-assisted chemical vapor deposition for the manufacture of boron-containing thin films. In fusion research, the neutron-absorbing nature of boron has led to the use of these thin boron-rich films to "boronize" the walls of the tokamak vacuum vessel to reduce recycling of particles and impurities into the plasma and improve overall performance.

== Safety ==
Decaborane, like pentaborane, is a powerful toxin affecting the central nervous system, although decaborane is less toxic than pentaborane. It can be absorbed through skin.

Purification by sublimation require a dynamic vacuum to remove evolved gases. Crude samples explode near 100 °C.

It forms an explosive mixture with carbon tetrachloride, which caused an often-mentioned explosion in a manufacturing facility.

In crystalline form, it reacts violently with red and white fuming nitric acid which has a use as rocket fuel oxidizer, producing an extremely powerful detonation.
