= Heteroborane =

Class of compounds of boron

Heteroboranes are classes of boranes in which at least one boron atom is replaced by another elements. Like many of the related boranes, these clusters are polyhedra and are similarly classified as closo-, nido-, arachno-, and hypho-, according to the so-called electron count. Closo- represents a complete polyhedron, while nido-, arachno- and hypho- stand for polyhedrons that are missing one, two and three vertices.

Besides carbon (carboranes or carbaboranes), other elements can also be included in the heteroborane molecules as well, such as Si (silaboranes), N (azaboranes, including borazine), P (phosphaboranes), As (arsaboranes), Sb (stibaboranes), O (oxaboranes), S (thiaboranes), Se (selenaboranes) and Te (telluraboranes), either alone or in combination.

Structurally, some heteroboranes can be derived from the icosahedral (I_{h}) [B_{12}H_{12}]^{2−} anion via formal replacement of its BH fragments with isoelectronic CH^{+}, P^{+} or S^{2+} fragments, e.g., closo-1-[CB_{11}H_{12}]^{−} and closo-1,2-C_{2}B_{10}H_{12} (two of the carboranes), closo-1,2-P_{2}B_{10}H_{10} (one of the phosphaboranes) or closo-1-SB_{11}H_{11} (one of the thiaboranes).

Heteroboranes are used in various fields, such as drug discovery, imaging, and nanotechnology.

== See also ==
- Carboranes
- Azaboranes
- Metallaboranes
- Metallacarboranes
- Dicarbollide
- Carborane superacid
