= E. D. Jemmis =

Indian theoretical chemist

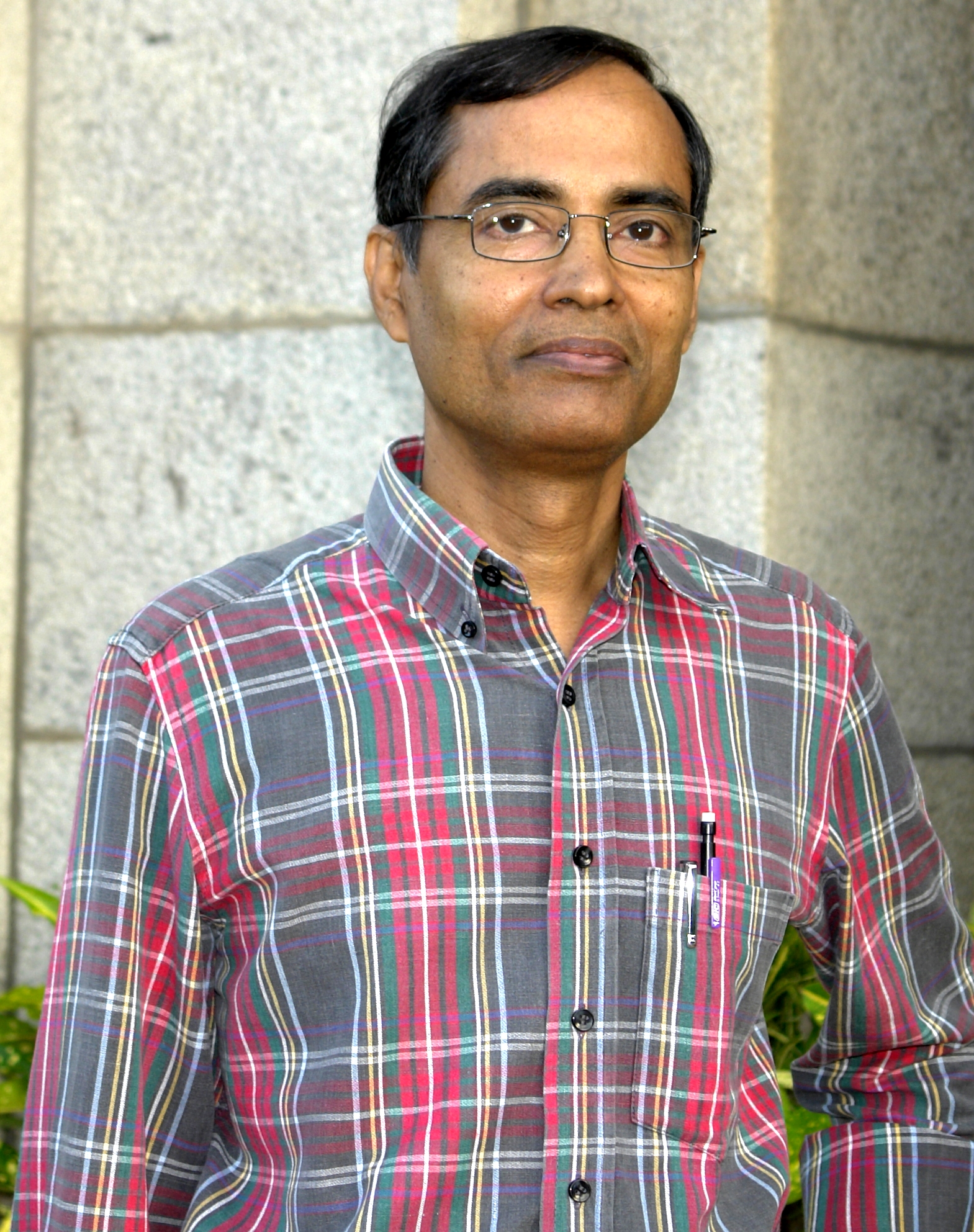
- Indian Institute of Science, 2010
- Born: 31 October 1951 (age 75); Chevvoor, Thrissur District, Kerala, India
- Education: University College Trichy; IIT Kanpur; Princeton University; Cornell University
- Known for: Jemmis ring-cap orbital overlap criteria Jemmis mno rules
- Awards: Padma Shri (2014)
- Scientific career
- Fields: Applied theoretical chemistry
- Workplaces: University of Hyderabad Indian Institute of Science Indian Institute of Science Education and Research, Thiruvananthapuram
- Doctoral advisor: Paul von Ragué Schleyer

Eluvathingal Devassy Jemmis (born 31 October 1951) is a professor of theoretical chemistry at the Indian Institute of Science, Bangalore, India. He was the founding director of Indian Institute of Science Education and Research, Thiruvananthapuram (IISER-TVM). His primary area of research is applied theoretical chemistry with emphasis on structure, bonding and reactivity, across the periodic table of the elements. Apart from many of his contributions to applied theoretical chemistry, an equivalent of the structural chemistry of carbon, as exemplified by the Huckel 4n+2 Rule, benzenoid aromatics and graphite, and tetrahedral carbon and diamond, is brought in the structural chemistry of boron by the Jemmis mno rules which relates polyhedral and macropolyhedral boranes to allotropes of boron and boron-rich solids. He has been awarded Padma Shri in Science and Engineering category (year 2014) by the Government of India.

== Education ==
Jemmis, after obtaining his B.Sc. from University College, Thiruvananthapuram and St. Thomas College, Thrissur and his M.Sc. from IIT Kanpur, joined Princeton University (1973) under the supervision of Profs Paul von Rague Schleyer and John Pople (1998 Nobel laureate). Moving along with his supervisors, Jemmis spent one semester at LMU Munich and four semesters at the University of Erlangen–Nuremberg. He was awarded a PhD degree (1978) from Princeton. After a two-year postdoctoral work at Cornell University with Professor Roald Hoffmann (1981 Nobel laureate), he joined the School of Chemistry, University of Hyderabad (1980) rising to the rank of professor (1990) and dean (2002). Jemmis was a visiting fellow at the Australian National University, Canberra (1991) and a visiting professor at the Centre for Computational Quantum Chemistry of the University of Georgia, Athens (2000). Jemmis is an honorary professor at JNCASR and an adjunct professor at ICTS-TIFR. In 2005, he accepted an invitation from the Indian Institute of Science (IISc), Bangalore, and joined the Department of Inorganic and Physical Chemistry. In 2008, Jemmis moved again, this time on a five-year deputation, accepting the responsibility to start the Indian Institute of Science Education and Research, Thiruvananthapuram and served there till 2013.

== Research ==
Jemmis is engaged in the study of structure and reactivity of molecules, clusters and solids using theoretical methods. A constant attempt is made by his group to find common threads between problems of different areas, viz. between organic and organometallic chemistry; amongst the chemistry of various main group elements; between polymorphs of elements and their compounds; etc. His research group not only gets numbers as an answer to a problem, but also tries to find out why the numbers turn out the way they do, based on overlap of orbitals, perturbation theory and symmetry, and devise transferable models. Significant results have been obtained in understanding the reactions of transition metal organometallics, week H-bond, electronic structure of three-dimensional aromatic compounds, polyhedral boranes, carboranes, silaboranes, electron counting rules for polycondensation, and structure of boron allotropes. The latter involved an extension of the Wade's Rules for polyhedral boranes to macropolyhedral boranes and the Huckel 4n+2 Rule to three dimensions. The Jemmis mno rules for polyhedral boranes have found a place in textbooks and are being taught in Inorganic Chemistry Courses in leading educational institutions around the world. Just as the basic tenets of the structural chemistry of carbon has stood the test of time, and led to major developments in carbon, the edifice of the structural chemistry expounded by Jemmis has already begun to do so for boron. Several of his predictions have been proved experimentally. He has mentored 20 PhD students and several postdoctoral and students and research associates, and published about 200 research articles.

== Memberships and honors ==
- Fellow of the Indian Academy of Sciences, Bangalore (1992)
- Shanti Swarup Bhatnagar Prize, Council of Scientific and Industrial Research, CSIR, New Delhi (1994)
- Robert S. Mulliken Lecture, University of Georgia, Athens, USA (2004)
- Fellow of the Academy of Sciences for the Developing World, Trieste, Italy (2004).
- J. C. Bose National Fellowship of the Department of Science and Technology, New Delhi (2006)
- "Prof. T. Navaneeth Rao National Best Teacher Award" in Chemistry (2006).
- Padma Shri Award (2014) by the Government of India.
- TWAS Prize (2003)
- Received the Hon DSc from Calicut university (2026)
