= Ortho-Carborane =

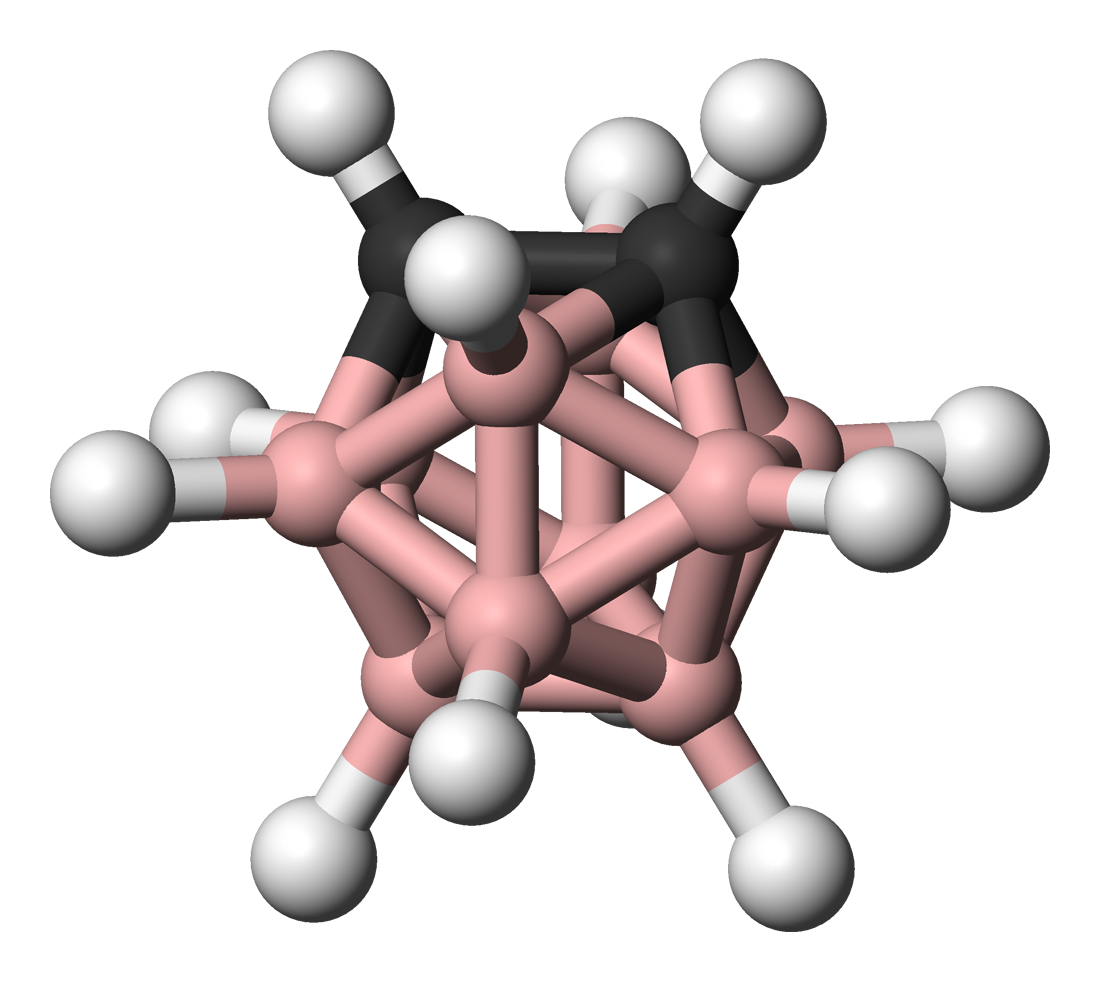

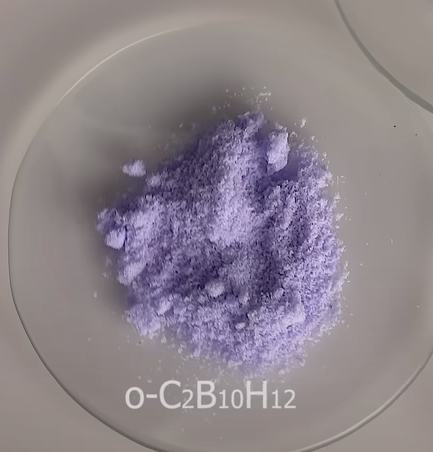
- Contaminated orthocarborane

Names
- Other names 1,2-Dicarbadodecaborane(12), ortho-dicarbadodecaborane

Identifiers
CAS Number	16872-09-6
3D model (JSmol)	Interactive image; Interactive image
ChEBI	CHEBI:38283
ChemSpider	21241501
ECHA InfoCard	100.037.164
EC Number	240-897-8
CompTox Dashboard (EPA)	DTXSID90937533
- InChI: InChI=1S/C2B10/c3-1-2-7(1,3)5-9(2,7)10(2)6-8(1,2,10)4(1,3)11(3,5,6)12(5,6,9)10 Key: DOPDSZSTXZNQMF-UHFFFAOYSA-N
- SMILES: [B@@]123B456B178[B@@]49B714B822B337C211B492C131B75=B621; [BH]1234[BH]5%12%13[BH]1%10%11[BH]289[BH]367[BH]145[BH]6%14%15[BH]78%16[BH]9%10%17[CH]%11%12%18[CH]1%13%14[BH]%15%16%17%18

Properties
Chemical formula	C_{2}H_{12}B_{10}
Molar mass	144.22 g·mol^{−1}
Appearance	colorless solid
Melting point	320 °C (608 °F; 593 K)

Hazards
- GHS labelling
Pictograms	(GHS02: Flammable) (GHS07: Exclamation mark)
Signal word	Warning
Hazard statements	H228, H302, H312, H332
Precautionary statements	P210, P240, P241, P261, P264, P270, P271, P280, P301+P312, P302+P352, P304+P312, P304+P340, P312, P322, P330, P363, P370+P378, P501
- Except where otherwise noted, data are given for materials in their standard state (at 25 °C [77 °F], 100 kPa). Infobox references

ortho-Carborane is the organoboron compound with the formula C_{2}B_{10}H_{12}. The prefix ortho is derived from the ortho- prefix used to signify that two substituents on an arene are adjacent to one another. It is the most prominent carborane. This derivative has been considered for a wide range of applications from heat-resistant polymers to medical applications. It is a colorless solid that melts, without decomposition, at 320 °C.

== Structure ==
The cluster has C_{2v} symmetry.

== Preparation ==
Ortho-carborane is prepared by the addition of acetylenes to decaborane(14). Modern syntheses involve two stages, the first involving generation of an adduct of decaborane:

B_{10}H_{14} + 2 SEt_{2} → B_{10}H_{12}(SEt_{2})_{2} + H_{2}

In the second stage, the alkyne is installed as the source of two carbon vertices:

B_{10}H_{12}(SEt_{2})_{2} + C_{2}H_{2} → C_{2}B_{10}H_{12} + 2 SEt_{2} + H_{2}

Substituted acetylenes can be employed more conveniently than acetylene gas. For example bis(acetoxymethyl)acetylene adds to the decarborane readily.

B_{10}H_{12}(SEt_{2})_{2} + C_{2}(CH_{2}O_{2}CCH_{3})_{2} → C_{2}B_{10}H_{10}(CH_{2}O_{2}CCH_{3})_{2} + 2 SEt_{2} + H_{2}

The organic substituents are removed by ester hydrolysis followed by oxidation:

3 C_{2}B_{10}H_{10}(CH_{2}O_{2}CH_{3})_{2} + 10 KOH + + 8 KMnO_{4} → 3 C_{2}B_{10}H_{12} + 6 CH_{3}CO_{2}K + 8 MnO_{2} + 6 K_{2}CO_{3} + 8 H_{2}O

== Reactions ==
=== Thermal rearrangement ===
Upon heating to 420 °C, it rearranges to form the meta isomer. The para isomer is produced by heating to temperatures above 600 °C.

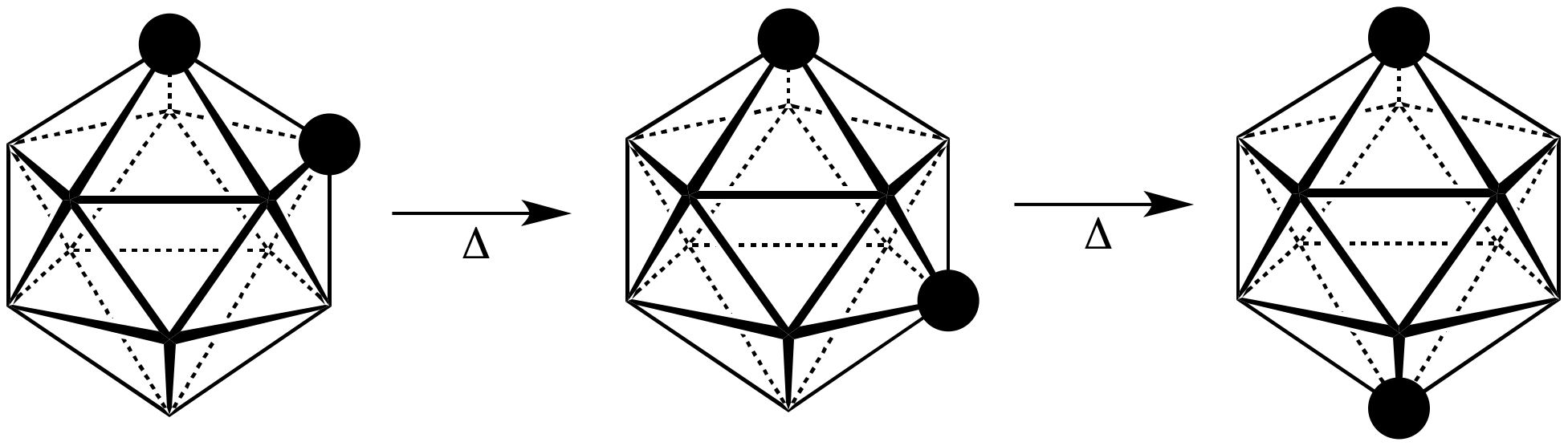
o-dicarborane and its meta- and para-isomers (CH vertex indicated with black spheres).

=== Reduction and "reverse isomerization" ===
ortho-Carborane undergoes 2e- reduction when treated with a solution of lithium in ammonia. The result is the nido cluster 7,9-[C_{2}B_{10}H_{12}]^{2-}. In the dianion, the carbon vertices are not adjacent. The same cluster is produced by reduction of meta-carborane. Oxidation of the resulting 7,9-[C_{2}B_{10}H_{12}]^{2-} gives ortho-carborane.

=== Deprotonation ===
Treatment with organolithium reagents gives the dilithio derivative.

C_{2}B_{10}H_{12} + 2 BuLi → Li_{2}C_{2}B_{10}H_{10} + 2 BuH

This dilithiated compound reacts with a variety of electrophiles, e.g. chlorophosphines, chlorosilanes, and sulfur.

=== Base-degradation to dicarbollide ===
Base degradation of ortho carborane gives the anionic 11-vertex derivative, precursor to dicarbollide complexes:

C_{2}B_{10}H_{12} + NaOEt + 2 EtOH → Na^{+}C_{2}B_{9}H_{12}^{−} + H_{2} + B(OEt)_{3}
Na^{+}C_{2}B_{9}H_{12}^{−} + NaH → Na_{2}C_{2}B_{8}H_{11} + H_{2}

Dicarbollides (C_{2}B_{8}H_{11}^{2-}) function as ligands for transition metals and f-elements. The dianion forms sandwich compounds, bis(dicarbollides). Dicarbollides, being strong electron donors, stabilize higher oxidation states, e.g. Ni(IV).

=== Deprotonation of carborane ===
The CH vertices of closo-dicarbadodecaboranes undergo deprotonation upon treatment with organolithium reagents:

C_{2}B_{10}H_{12} + 2 BuLi → Li_{2}C_{2}B_{10}H_{10} + 2 BuH

These dilithiated compounds react with a variety of electrophiles, e.g. chlorophosphines, chlorosilanes, and sulfur. Many of the same compounds can be produced by hydroboration of alkynes:

Li_{2}C_{2}B_{10}H_{10} + 2 RX → R_{2}C_{2}B_{10}H_{10} + 2 LiX
L_{2}B_{10}H_{10} + RC_{2}R → R_{2}C_{2}B_{10}H_{10} + 2 L (L = MeCN, etc.)

ortho-Carborane can be converted to highly reactive carborynes with the formula B_{10}C_{2}H_{10}.

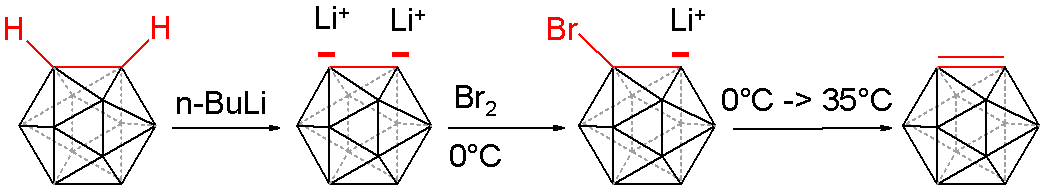

=== Substitution at the boron vertices ===
Unlike the hydrogens on the carbon vertices, the hydrogens on the boron vertices are not acidic and do not react with strong bases. This is because boron is not as electronegative as carbon and thus the polarity of the B—H bonds is relatively low. Substitution at the boron vertices is still possible using halogenating agents through electrophilic substitution or photochemical reactions.

For example, the boron vertices at the 9 and 12 positions opposite to the carbon vertices can be iodinated using iodine and a catalytic amount of AlCl_{3} while in refluxing dichloromethane.

Diiodination of ortho-carborane at the 9 and 12 vertices.

Exohedral halogenation leads to an increase in the electron withdrawing effect of the carborane which increases the acidity of the C—H bonds especially when the halogens are located at the 9, and 12 positions. Per-halogenation is also possible and when increasing the number of halide atoms, the π backdonation ability of the halide decreases allowing for the formation of intramolecular halide-halide noncovalent bonds.

Alkylation of ortho-carborane at the 9 and 12 vertices via cross-coupling reaction with a palladium catalyst.

Iodinated derivatives of carborane can be further modified to access boron alkylated products via a cross coupling reaction. This can be done by treating the halogenated carborane with a Grignard reagent in the presence of a phosphine palladium complex. The bromo and chloro compounds do not react under the same conditions.

=== Dimerization of carborane ===
Copper-mediated coupling of two ortho-carborane cages.

Upon treatment of ortho-carboranes with organolithium reagents such as n-Butyllithium, the CH vertices of the carborane cage can be deprotonated, affording the dilithiated ortho-carborane cage. Taking advantage of this more active carbon-lithium bond, the metalated carborane cages can then be treated with copper(I) chloride while in organic solvents, resulting in a copper-mediated carbon-carbon coupling reaction of the carborane cages. The copper salt is needed to avoid unwanted carbon-boron and boron-boron coupling reactions. The reaction mixture is allowed to stir at room temperature for two days, forming a copper-metalated carborane cage. Finally, the mixture is treated with 3M hydrochloric acid to quench the reaction process. The crude product is then purified via column chromatography and affords one half-equivalent of the carbon-carbon linked dimer of the original ortho-carborane in high yields. Worth noting is the effect of donating solvents on the yields of the reactions, as yields in solvents such as tetrahydrofuran and diethyl ether afford product in greatly decreased yields.

== History ==
The preparation of closo-dicarbadodecaboranes was reported independently by groups at Olin Corporation and the Reaction Motors Division of Thiokol Chemical Corporation working under the U.S. Air Force and published in 1963. These groups demonstrated the high stability in air of 1,2-closo-dodecaborane and related compounds, presented a general synthesis, described the transformation of substituents without destroying the carborane cluster, and demonstrated the ortho to meta isomerization.

== See also ==
- Heteroborane
- Organoboron chemistry
- Platonic hydrocarbon
