= Carboryne =

In organoboron chemistry, a carboryne is an unstable derivative of ortho-carborane with the formula B_{10}C_{2}H_{10}. They are also called 1,2-dehydro-o-carboranes. The hydrogen atoms on the C2 unit in the parent o-carborane are missing. The compound resembles and is isolobal with benzyne. A carboryne compound was first generated in 1990 starting from o-carborane. The hydrogen atoms connected to carbon are removed by n-butyllithium in tetrahydrofuran and the resulting lithium dianion is reacted with bromine at 0 °C to form the bromo monoanion.

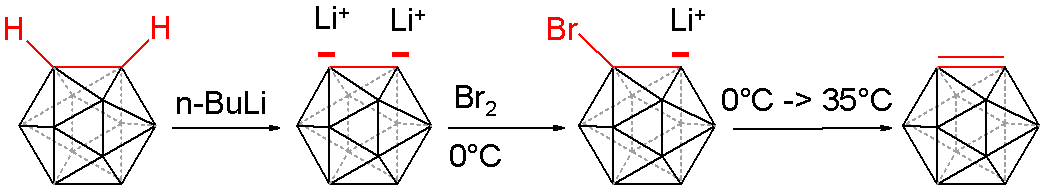

Heating the reaction mixture to 35 °C releases carboryne, which can subsequently be trapped with suitable dienes:

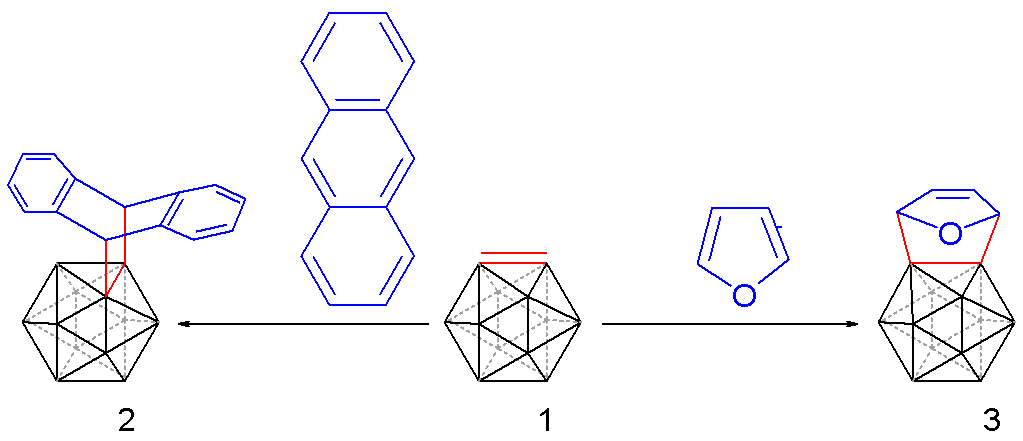

such as anthracene (to afford a triptycene-like molecule) and furan in 10 to 25% chemical yield.

Carborynes react with alkynes to benzocarboranes in an adaptation of the above described procedure. O-carborane is deprotonated with n-butyllithium as before and then reacted with dichloro-di(triphenylphosphino) nickel to a nickel coordinated carboryne. This compound reacts with 3-hexyne in an alkyne trimerization to the benzocarborane.

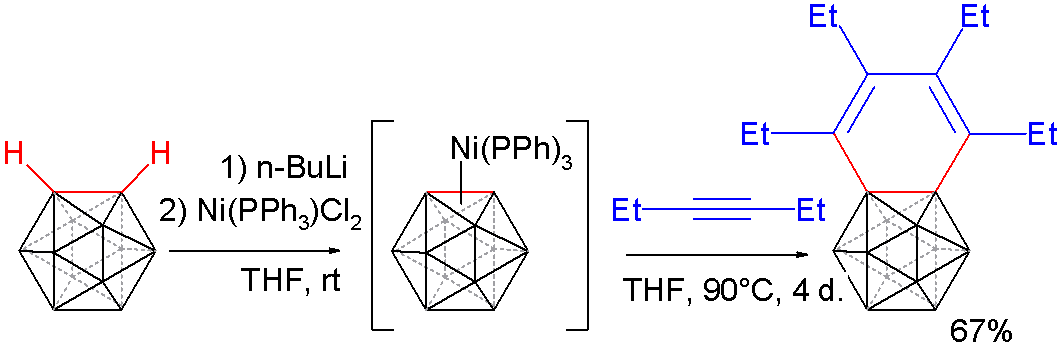

Single crystal X-ray diffraction analysis of this compound shows considerable bond length alternation in the benzene ring (164.8 pm to 133.8 pm) ruling out aromaticity.

== See also ==
- Heteroborane
- Organoboron chemistry
