= Sodium dicarbollylcobaltate(III) =

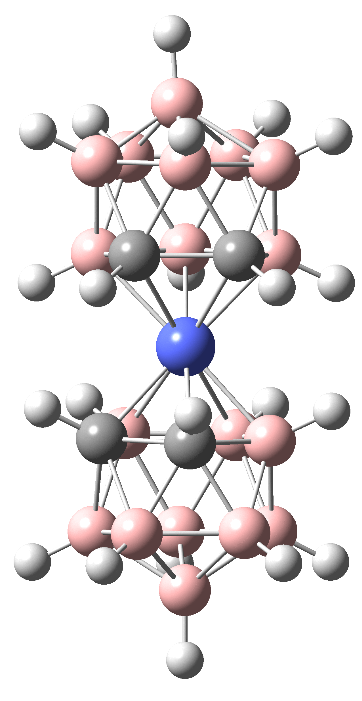
Dicarbollylcobaltate anion
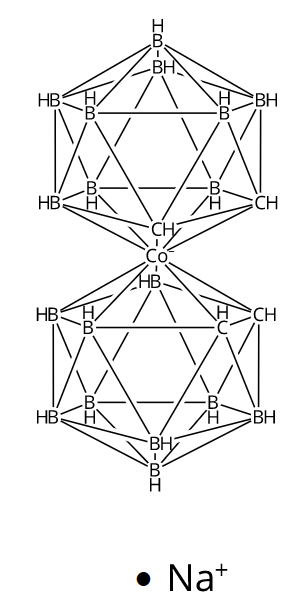

Names
- Other names Sodium cobalticarborane

Identifiers
CAS Number	99492-72-5
3D model (JSmol)	Interactive image
EC Number	621-559-2
CompTox Dashboard (EPA)	DTXSID80746075
- InChI: InChI=1S/2C2H11B9.Co.Na/c2*1-2-4-5-3(1)7(1)6(1,2)8(2,4)10(4,5)9(3,5,7)11(6,7,8)10;;/h2*1-11H;;/q2*-2;-1;+1 Key: BXETWCRGIFRIOO-UHFFFAOYSA-N
- SMILES: [B-H]1234[BH]5%12%13[B-H]1%10%11[BH]289[BH]367[BH]145[BH]6%14[BH]78[BH]9%10[CH]%11%12[CH]1%13%14.[B-H]1234[BH]5%12%13[B-H]1%10%11[BH]289[BH]367[BH]145[BH]6%14[BH]78[BH]9%10[CH]%11%12[CH]1%13%14.[Na+].[Co-]

Properties
Chemical formula	C_{4}H_{22}B_{18}CoNa
Molar mass	346.72 g·mol^{−1}
Appearance	Red crystals or yellow powder
Melting point	>300°C

Hazards
- GHS labelling
Pictograms	(GHS07: Exclamation mark)
Signal word	Warning
Hazard statements	H315, H319, H335
Precautionary statements	P261, P264, P264+P265, P271, P280, P302+P352, P304+P340, P305+P351+P338, P319, P321, P332+P317, P337+P317, P362+P364, P403+P233, P405, P501
- Except where otherwise noted, data are given for materials in their standard state (at 25 °C [77 °F], 100 kPa). Infobox references

Dicarbollylcobaltate(III) anion is a dicarbollide cluster compound containing cobaltic cation (III) as a metal center. The dicarbollylcobaltate(III) anion can be abbreviated to [COSAN]^{−} or [CoD]^{−}. The center cobaltic cation is sandwiched by two dicarbollide clusters, so that it can be regarded as the carboranyl version of Cp_{2}Co^{+}.

The countercation of dicarbollylcobaltate(III) could be Na^{+}, Cs^{+}, H^{+}, NH_{4}^{+}, and other transition and main group metals. Among them, Na^{+} is the most commonly used cation.

== Synthesis ==
Sodium dicarbollylcobaltate could be synthesized from o-carborane. Lewis bases like butylamine and sodium hydroxide could attack the boron that is connected by two carbon atoms and subsequently remove this boron atom from the carborane skeleton, affording sodium 7,8-dicarbaundecaborate(1-).

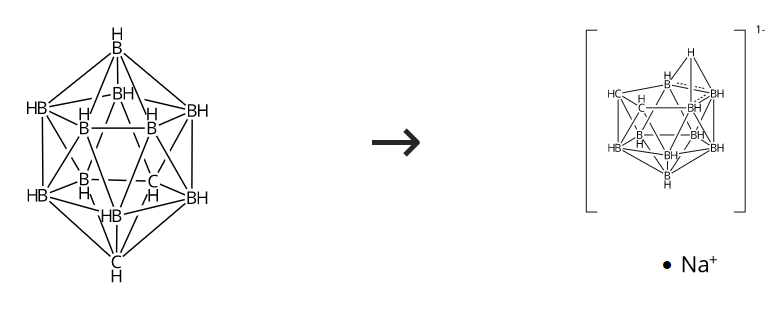
From o-carborane to sodium dicarbaundecaborate

Then, two equivalents of sodium 7,8-dicarbaundecaborate could react with cobalt acetate tetrahydrate at high temperatures, leading to the formation of one equivalent of sodium acetate and one equivalent of sodium dicarbollylcobaltate.

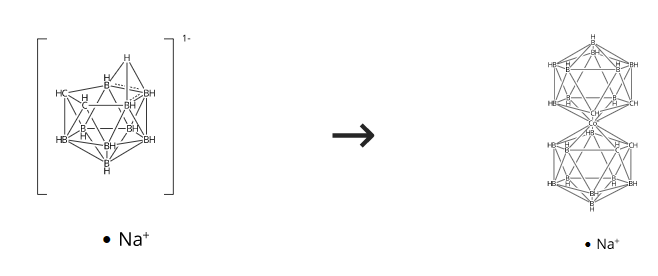
From sodium dicarbaundecaborate to sodium dicarbollylcobaltate

The synthesis of sodium dicarbollylcobaltate could also be accomplished by ion exchange. First, the aqueous solution of the cesium salt could be acidified by sulfuric acid and be extracted in organic phase. Then using sodium carbonate as sodium source to react with acidified dicarbollylcobaltate to get the sodium dicarbaundecaborate.

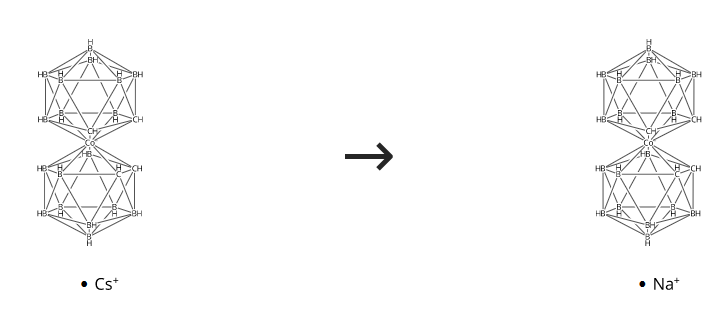
From cesium dicarbollylcobaltate to Sodium dicarbollylcobaltate

== Reactivity ==
The reactivity of the B-H bond in dicarbollylcobaltate is similar to that in o-carborane compounds. Until now, dicarbollylcobaltate anion has mostly been used as a spectator ion in the fields of catalytic chemistry, structural chemistry, and supramolecular chemistry. However, there is an example of the functionalization of the dicarbollylcobaltate anion.

The preparation of iodonium zwitterions of dicarbollylcobaltate could be accomplished by the reaction of dicarbollylcobaltate with ArI(OAc)_{2} (Ar = Ph and 4-MeOC_{6}H_{4}) in 70% aqueous AcOH or CF_{3}COOH.

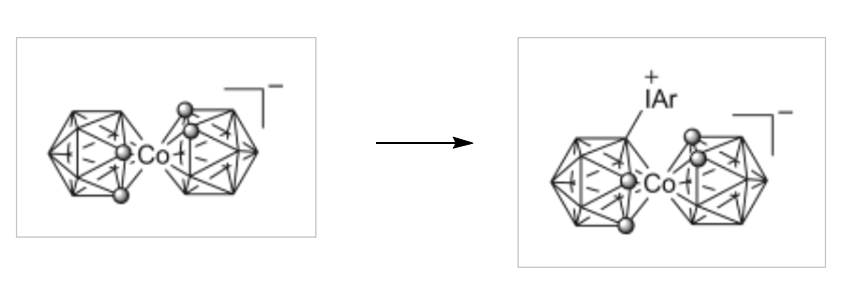
The preparation of iodonium zwitterions

The iodonium zwitterions could subsequently transform to other functionalized dicarbollylcobaltate by adding the appropriate nucleophiles. The reaction of the iodonium zwitterions with Me_{2}NCHS and NEt_{4}^{+}CN^{−} lead to corresponding closo-borate derivatives.

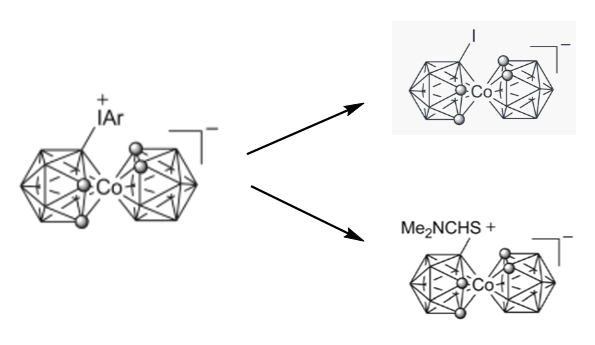
Subsequent transformations from iodonium zwitterions

== Applications ==
Dicarbollylcobaltate anion is stable enough in common organic solvent and water. Because of the uniqueness of its hydridic B-H vertices and charge delocalization, the [CoD]^{−} anion exhibits surface activity and has an amphiphilic character. [CoD]- could be also used in radioactive ion extraction. Due to the abundant boron atoms of [CoD]^{−}, it also could be used in biomedical chemistry. (Boron neutron capture therapy is an important targeted radiation cancer therapy) Besides, because [CoD]^{−} accumulates at interfaces and is soluble in both oil and water, [CoD]^{−} could be also used in self-assembly in water.

== Structural analysis ==
The 1,2-B_{9}C_{2}H_{11}^{2-} ion could be regarded as a ligand donating 6 electrons. The two carbon atoms and three boron atoms have approximately sp^{3} orbitals directed at the vacant 3-vertex. Therefore, with cobalt(III) as the metal center and a negative charge, the ion satisfies the 18-electron rule.
