= Chevoor =

Chevoor Chovvur, Chovoor
- Census Town
- Nickname: Furniture City
- Location in Kerala, India
- Coordinates: 10°27′21″N 76°12′32″E
- Country: India
- State: Kerala
- District: Thrissur

Government
  - Body: Avinissery Grama Panchayath, Cherpu Grama Panchayath

Population (2001)
  - Total: 17,373
- Time zone: UTC+5:30 (IST)
- PIN: 680027
- Vehicle registration: KL 75

Chevoor is a census town in Thrissur district in the Indian state of Kerala. Chevvoor, or Chovvur as it is called in the Indian postal department, is 9 km from Thrissur city on the Thrissur-Irinjalakuda/Kodungallor/Thriprayar route. It is a little hillock surrounded by paddy fields. The name Chevvoor could have been derived from the fact that this place was developed, with levelled roads and living areas (Chovvulla Ur in Malayalam means straightened place).

== Demographics ==
As of 2001 Indian census, Chevvoor had a population of 17,373. Males constitute 48% of the population and females 52%. Chevvoor has an average literacy rate of 84%, higher than the national average of 59.5%; with male literacy of 86% and female literacy of 82%. Eleven percent of the population is under 6 years of age.

Chevoor is 9 km away from Thrissur town. It is approx. 17-18 km away from Irinjalakuda and Thriprayar. The nearest railway station is at Ollur and Pudukkad respectively. There are various bus routes both KSRTC and private running through Chevoor.

=== Bus Routes ===
- Thrissur - (via Cherpu) Thriprayar
- Thrissur - (via Cherpu - Urakam - Ettumana) Thriprayar
- Thrissur - (via Cherpu) - Kattur
- Thrissur - (via Urakam) - Arratupuzha
- Thrissur - (via Urakam) - Irinjalakuda
- Thrissur - (via Urakam) - Irinjalakuda - Mala
- Thrissur - (via Urakam) - Irinjalakuda - Mathilakam
- Thrissur - (via Urakam) - Irinjalakuda - Kodungaloor (KSRTC - LS and Private)
- Thrissur - (via Urakam) - Irinjalakuda - Kodungaloor - Paravur - Ernakulam
- Thiruvilwamala - Thrissur - (via Urakam) - Irinjalakuda - Kodungaloor
- Ottapalam - Thrissur - (via Urakam) - Irinjalakuda - Kodungaloor
- Palakkad - Thrissur - (via Urakam) - Irinjalakuda - Kodungaloor

== The Furniture Hub ==
Chevoor has had a long legacy of being a key hub of the furniture trade in South India. The furniture business of Chevoor is more than 100 years old. Almost all houses here own a manufacturing unit and a showroom. More than 10,000 workers are associated with the furniture business in Chevoor. Rose Wood and Teak Wood are mainly used here and all types of furniture are available here.

== Educational institutions ==
=== Schools ===
1. St. Xavier’s High School, Chevoor
2. CALPS Lower Primary School, Chevoor

== Religion ==
=== Churches in Chevoor ===
1. St. Francis Xavier’s Church, Chevoor
2. Sacred Heart Church, Perinchery, Chevoor
3. St. Xavier's Chapel, Chevoor
4. St. Mary’s Chapel, Chevoor
5. St. Antony’s Chapel, Chevoor

=== Temples in Chevoor ===
1. Sree Mahalakshmi Temple, Chevoor
2. Sree Narasimha Moorthy Temple, Karipperi Mana, Chevoor
3. Keezhthrikkovil Temple, Chevoor
4. Parthasaradhi Temple, Pathanapuram, Chevoor
5. Madathil Temple, Perinchery Madam Temple Rd, Chevoor
6. Kuttikattuparambil Rudhiramala temple, Chevoor
7. Kudakuthykavvu temple, Chevoor
