= Butterfly cluster compound =

Structure of [Re_{4}(CO)_{16}]^{2−}, a butterfly cluster.

In the area of metal cluster chemistry, a butterfly cluster compound usually describes tetrametallic clusters containing five M-M bonds. A prototype of this motif is [Re_{4}(CO)_{16}]^{2−}. Most butterfly clusters have additional bridging ligands. One example is the pentaphosphide [[Rh_{4}(CO)_{5}(PPh_{2})_{5}]]^{−} where all Rh---Rh edges are bridged by PPh_{2}. A carbide-containing butterfly cluster is [Fe_{4}C(CO)_{12}]^{2−} where the carbide is bonded to all four Fe centers.

Bonding in such clusters is often discussed in the context of polyhedral skeletal electron pair theory. This theory predicts that tetrametallic clusters with 60 valence electrons will adopt tetrahedral geometry with six M-M bonds. Tetrahedral clusters is classified as nido clusters. By addition of 2e, the 60e cluster opens one edge, as manifested in the butterfly motif.
