= Azaborane =

Borane cluster

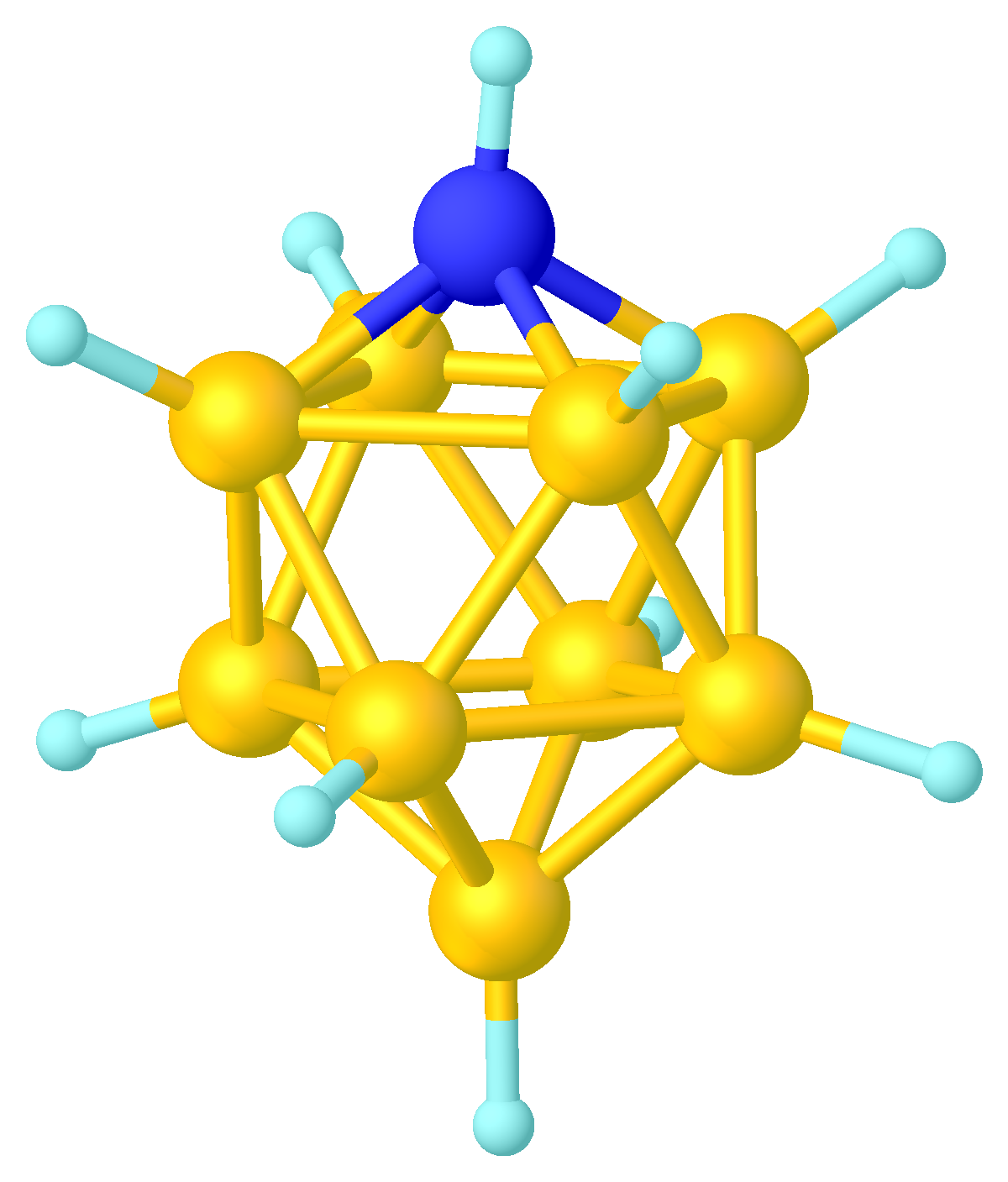
Structure of closo-NB_{9}H_{10}

Azaborane usually refers a borane cluster where BH vertices are replaced by N or NR (R stands typically for H or organic substituent). Like many of the related boranes, these clusters are polyhedra and can be classified as closo-, nido-, arachno-, etc.

Within the context of Wade's rules, NR is a 4-electron vertex, and N is a 3-electron vertex. Prominent examples are the charge-neutral nido-NB_{10}H_{13} (i.e. (NH)(BH)_{10}) and closo-NB_{11}H_{12} (i.e. (NH)(BH)_{11}).

Azaboranes can also refer to simpler compounds including iminoboranes (RB=NR', where R and R' stand typically for H or organic substituent) and borazines.

== See also ==
- Carborane
