= Styx rule =

Chemical rule used to calculate the structures of boranes

The styx rule, also known as Lipscomb's styx rule, can be used to calculate the structures of boranes. It was developed by William Lipscomb in 1954. The rule defines boranes to have four types of bonds besides the terminal B-H bonds:

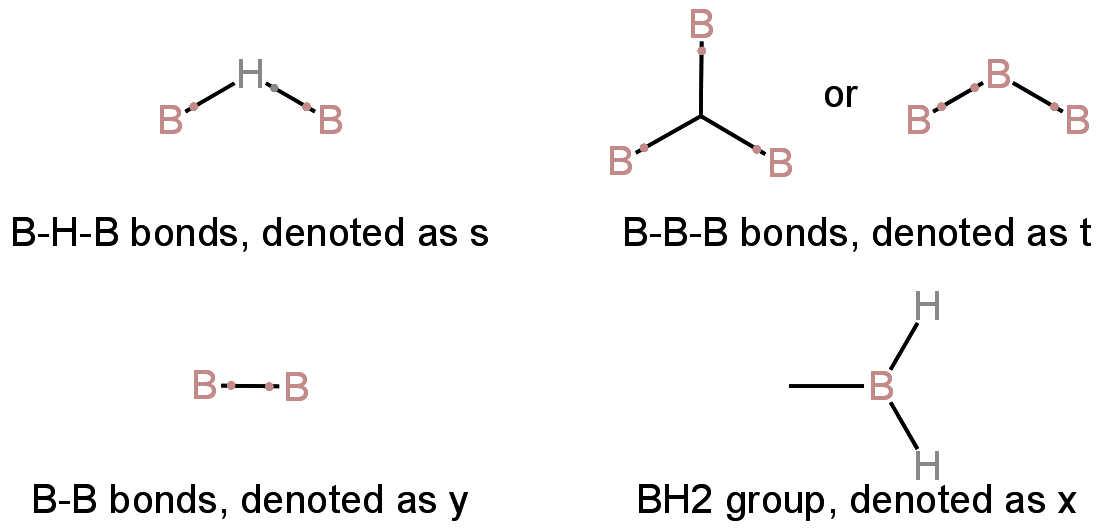
The structures assigned to the letters s, t, y, and x

Where:

- B-H-B bonds are 3c-2e bonds, taking up three orbitals and two valence electrons.
- B-B-B bonds are 3c-2e bonds, taking up three orbitals and two valence electrons.
- B-B bonds are 2c-2e bonds, taking up two orbitals and two valence electrons.
- The -BH_{2} group consists of an extra B-H bond formed on the BH units and is thus considered to take up two orbitals and two valence electrons.

The bonding structure deduced by the styx rule doesn't reflect the true symmetry of boranes. More modern methods that more accurately reflect the bonding nature of boranes like Wade's rules have been developed.

== Calculation ==
When given the chemical formula of a borane (B_{m}H_{n}), one can deduce its styx numbers by first separating the formula into (BH)_{m}H_{n-m}. Then, one can make use of three equations:

1. s+x=n-m, due to the number of hydrogen atoms
2. 3m+n=2m+2s+2t+2y+2x, due to the number of electrons
3. 4m+n=2(n-m)+3s+3t+2y+2x, due to the number of bonding orbitals

With these, one can come up with several integer combinations of styx. However, some are ruled out because styx are non-negative.

== See also ==
- Wade's rule
