= Carborane =

Class of chemical compounds

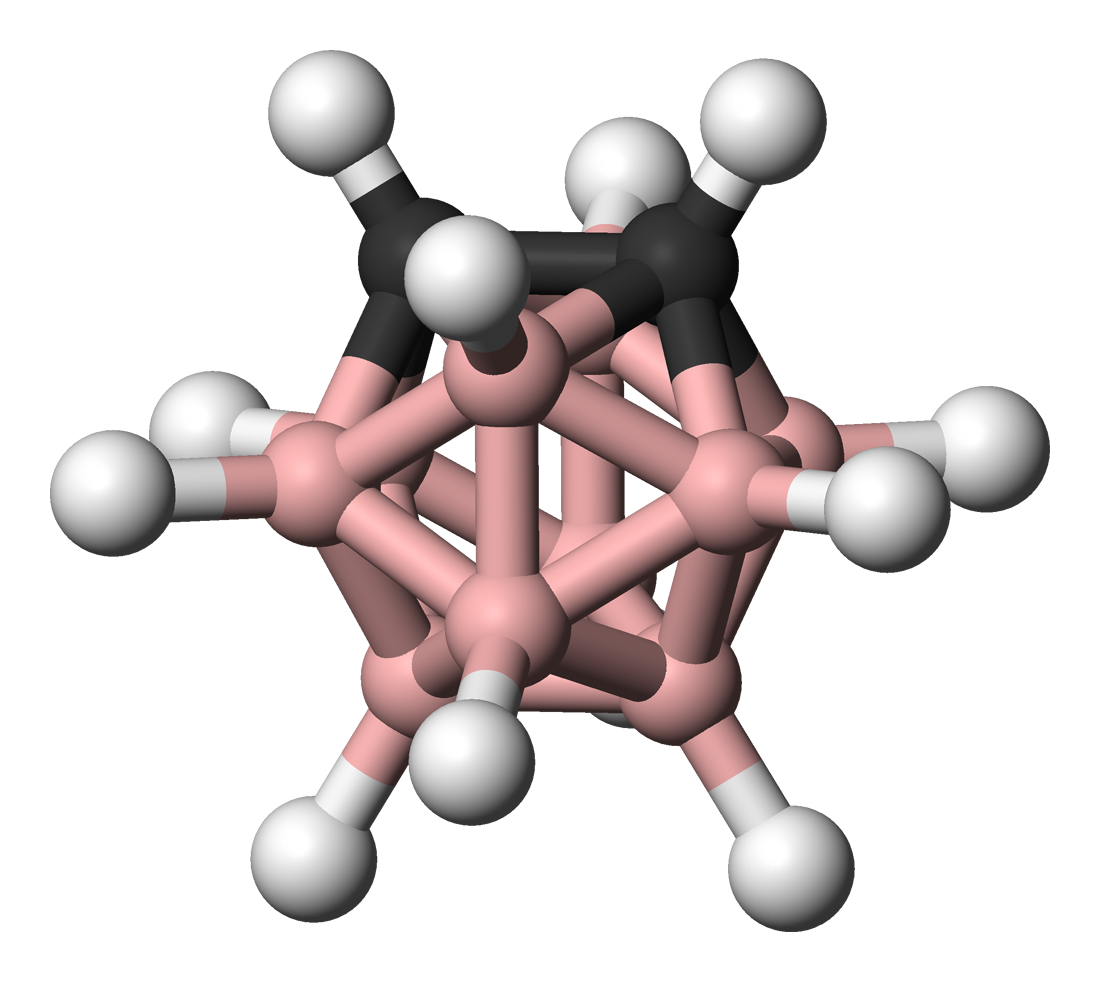
Ball-and-stick model of o-carborane

Carboranes (or carbaboranes) are electron-delocalized (non-classically bonded) clusters composed of boron, carbon and hydrogen atoms. Like many of the related boron hydrides, these clusters are polyhedra or fragments of polyhedra. Carboranes are one class of heteroboranes.

In terms of scope, carboranes can have as few as 5 and as many as 14 atoms in the cage framework. The majority have two cage carbon atoms. The corresponding C-alkyl and B-alkyl analogues are also known in a few cases.

== Structure and bonding ==
Carboranes and boranes adopt 3-dimensional cage (cluster) geometries in sharp contrast to typical organic compounds. Cages are compatible with sigma—delocalized bonding, whereas hydrocarbons are typically chains or rings.

Like for other electron-delocalized polyhedral clusters, the electronic structure of these cluster compounds can be described by the Wade–Mingos rules. Like the related boron hydrides, these clusters are polyhedra or fragments of polyhedra, and are similarly classified as closo-, nido-, arachno-, hypho-, hypercloso-, iso-, klado-, conjuncto- and megalo-, based on whether they represent a complete (closo-) polyhedron or a polyhedron that is missing one (nido-), two (arachno-), three (hypho-), or more vertices. Carboranes are a notable example of heteroboranes. In essence, these rules emphasize delocalized, multi-centered bonding for B-B, C-C, and B-C interactions.

Structurally, they can be considered to be related to the icosahedral (I_{h}) [B_{12}H_{12}]^{2−} via formal replacement of two of its BH^{−} fragments with CH.

=== Isomers ===
Geometrical isomers of carboranes can exist on the basis of the various locations of carbon within the cage. Isomers necessitate the use of the numerical prefixes in a compound's name. The closo-dicarbadecaborane can exist in three isomers: 1,2-, 1,7-, and 1,12-C_{2}B_{10}H_{12}.

== Preparation ==
Carboranes have been prepared by many routes, the most common being addition of alkynyl reagents to boron hydride clusters to form dicarbon carboranes. For this reason, the great majority of carborane have two carbon vertices.

=== Monocarba derivatives ===
Monocarboranes are clusters with B_{n}C cages. The 12-vertex derivative is best studied, but several are known.

Typically they are prepared by the addition of one-carbon reagents to boron hydride clusters. One-carbon reagents include cyanide, isocyanides, and formaldehyde. For example, monocarbadodecaborate ([CB_{11}H_{12}]^{−}) is produced from decaborane and formaldehyde, followed by addition of borane dimethylsulfide. Monocarboranes are precursors to weakly coordinating anions.

=== Dicarba clusters ===
Dicarbaboranes can be prepared from boron hydrides using alkynes as the source of the two carbon centers. In addition to the closo-C_{2}B_{n}H_{n+2} series mentioned above, several open-cage dicarbon species are known including nido-C_{2}B_{3}H_{7} (isostructural and isoelectronic with B_{5}H_{9}) and arachno-C_{2}B_{7}H_{13}.

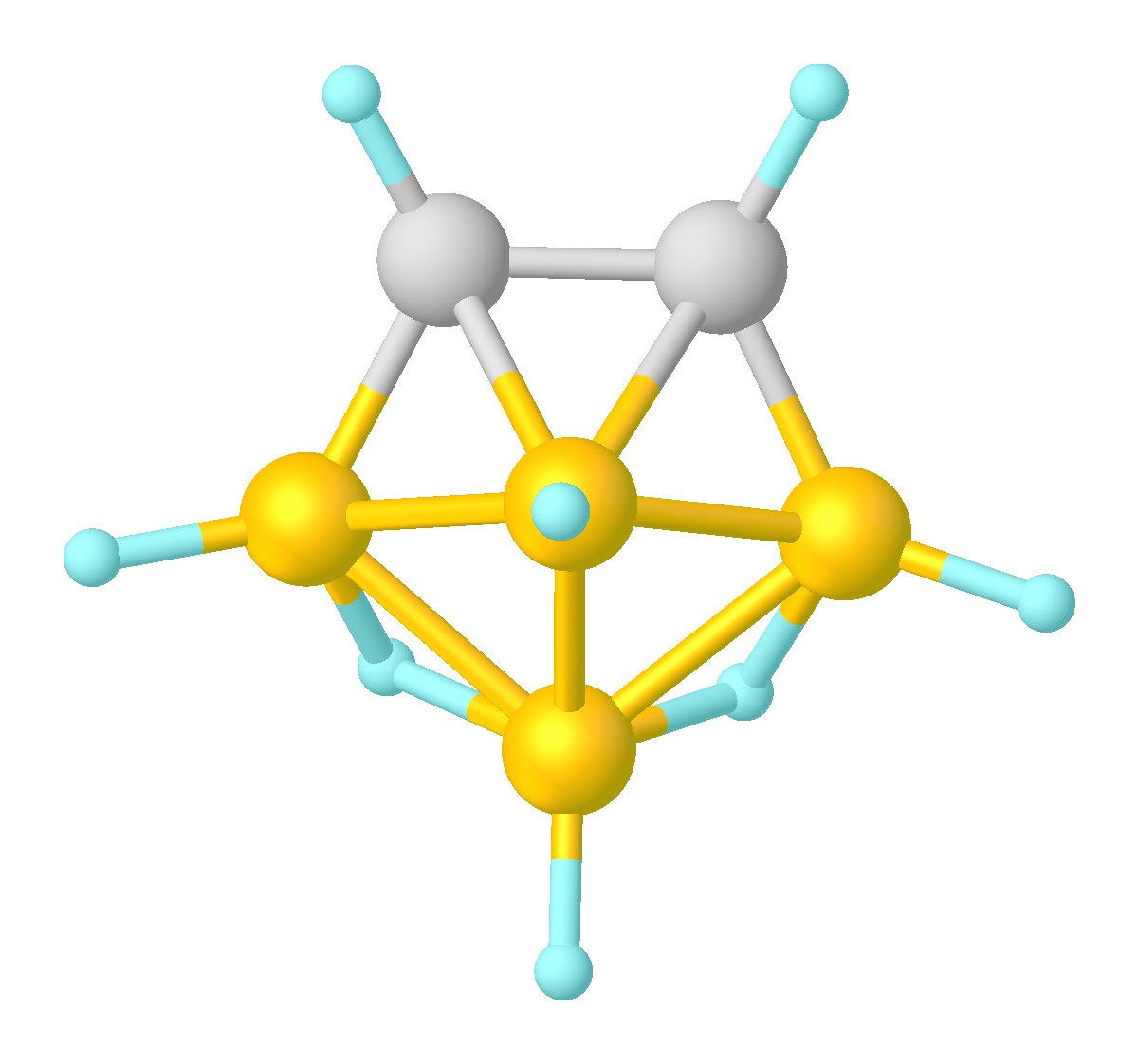
Structure of nido-C_{2}B_{4}H_{8}, highlighting some trends: carbon at the low connectivity sites, bridging hydrogen between B centers on open face

Syntheses of icosahedral closo-dicarbadodecaborane derivatives (R_{2}C_{2}B_{10}H_{10}) employ alkynes as the R_{2}C_{2} source and decaborane (B_{10}H_{14}) to supply the B_{10} unit.

== Classification by cage size ==
The following classification is adapted from Grimes's book on carboranes.

=== Small, open carboranes ===
This family of clusters includes the nido cages CB_{5}H_{9}, C_{2}B_{4}H_{8}, C_{3}B_{3}H_{7}, C_{4}B_{2}H_{6}, and C_{2}B_{3}H_{7}. Relatively little work has been devoted to these compounds. Pentaborane[9] reacts with acetylene to give nido-1,2-C_{2}B_{4}H_{8}. Upon treatment with sodium hydride, latter forms the salt [1,2-C_{2}B_{4}H_{7}]^{−}Na^{+}.

=== Small, closed carboranes ===
This family of clusters includes the closo cages C_{2}B_{3}H_{5}, C_{2}B_{4}H_{6}, C_{2}B_{5}H_{7}, and CB_{5}H_{7}. This family of clusters are also lightly studied owing to synthetic difficulties. Also reflecting synthetic challenges, many of these compounds are best known as their alkyl derivatives. 1,5-C_{2}B_{3}H_{5} is the only known isomer of the five-vertex cage. It is prepared from the reaction of pentaborane(9) with acetylene in two operations beginning with condensation with acetylene followed by pyrolysis (cracking) of the product:

B_{5}H_{9} + C_{2}H_{2} → nido-2,3-C_{2}B_{4}H_{8} + BH_{3}
C_{2}B_{4}H_{8} → closo-2,3-C_{2}B_{3}H_{5} + BH_{3}

=== Intermediate-sized carboranes ===
Structure of 1,3-C_{2}B_{7}H_{13} (all unlabeled vertices are BH).

==== Structures ====
This family of clusters includes the closo cages C_{2}B_{6}H_{8}, C_{2}B_{7}H_{9}, C_{2}B_{8}H_{10} and C_{2}B_{9}H_{11} and their derivatives. Isomerism is well established in this family:

- 2,3- and 2,4-C_{2}B_{4}H_{8}
- 2,3- and 2,4-C_{2}B_{5}H_{7}
- 1,2- and 1,6-C_{2}B_{6}H_{8}
- 1,10-, 1,6-, and 1,2-C_{2}B_{8}H_{10}
- 1,2 and 1,3-C_{2}B_{9}H_{13}.

==== Syntheses ====
Carboranes of intermediate nuclearity are most efficiently generated by degradations from larger clusters. In contrast, smaller carboranes are usually prepared by building-up routes, e.g. from pentaborane + alkyne, etc. For example ortho-carborane can be degraded to give [C_{2}B_{9}H_{12}]^{−}, which can be manipulated with oxidants, protonation, and thermolysis.

[C_{2}B_{9}H_{12}]^{−} + Fe^{3+} → C_{2}B_{8}H_{12} + "B^{+}" + Fe^{2+}
[C_{2}B_{9}H_{12}]^{−} + H^{+} → C_{2}B_{9}H_{13}
C_{2}B_{9}H_{13} → C_{2}B_{9}H_{11} + H_{2}

Chromate oxidation of 11-vertex clusters results in deboronation, giving C_{2}B_{7}H_{13}. From that species, other clusters result by pyrolysis, sometimes in the presence of diborane: C_{2}B_{6}H_{8}, C_{2}B_{8}H_{10}, and C_{2}B_{7}H_{9}.

In general, isomers having non-adjacent cage carbon atoms are more thermally stable than those with adjacent carbons. Thus, heating tends to induce mutual separation of the carbon atoms in the framework.

=== Icosahedral carboranes ===
The icosahedral charge-neutral closo-carboranes, 1,2-, 1,7-, and 1,12- C_{2}B_{10}H_{12} (informally ortho-, meta-, and para-carborane) are particularly stable and are commercially available. The ortho-carborane forms first upon the reaction of decaborane and acetylene. It converts quantitatively to the meta-carborane upon heating in an inert atmosphere. Producing meta-carborane from ortho-carborane requires 700 °C, proceeding in ca. 25% yield.

[CB_{11}H_{12}]^{−} is also well established.

== Reactions ==
The metalation of carboranes is illustrated by the reactions of closo-C_{2}B_{3}H_{5} with iron carbonyl sources. Two closo Fe- and Fe_{2}-containing products are obtained, according to these idealized equations:

C_{2}B_{3}H_{5} + Fe_{2}(CO)_{9} → C_{2}B_{3}H_{5}Fe(CO)_{3} + Fe(CO)_{5} + CO
C_{2}B_{3}H_{5}Fe(CO)_{3} + Fe_{2}(CO)_{9} → C_{2}B_{3}H_{5}(Fe(CO)_{3})_{2} + Fe(CO)_{5} + CO

Base-induced degradation of carboranes give anionic nido derivatives, which can also be employed as ligands for transition metals, generating metallacarboranes, which are carboranes containing one or more transition metal or main group metal atoms in the cage framework. Most famous are the dicarbollide, complexes with the formula M^{2+}[C_{2}B_{9}H_{11}]^{2−}, where M stands for metal.

Carborane substituents on an arene are electron-withdrawing.

== Research ==
Dicarbollide complexes have been investigated for many years, but commercial applications are rare. The bis(dicarbollide) [Co(C_{2}B_{9}H_{11})_{2}]^{−} has been used as a precipitant for removal of ^{137}Cs^{+} from radiowastes.

The medical applications of carboranes have been explored. C-functionalized carboranes represent a source of boron for boron neutron capture therapy.

The compound H(CHB_{11}Cl_{11}) is a superacid, forming an isolable salt with protonated benzene cation, [C_{6}H_{7}]^{+} (benzenium cation). The formula of that salt is [C_{6}H_{7}]^{+}[CHB_{11}Cl_{11}]^{−}. The superacid protonates fullerene, C_{60}.

== See also ==
- Azaborane
- Metallaborane
- Heteroborane
- Metallacarboranes
- Organoboron chemistry
- Dicarbollide
- Carborane acid
