= Metallaborane =

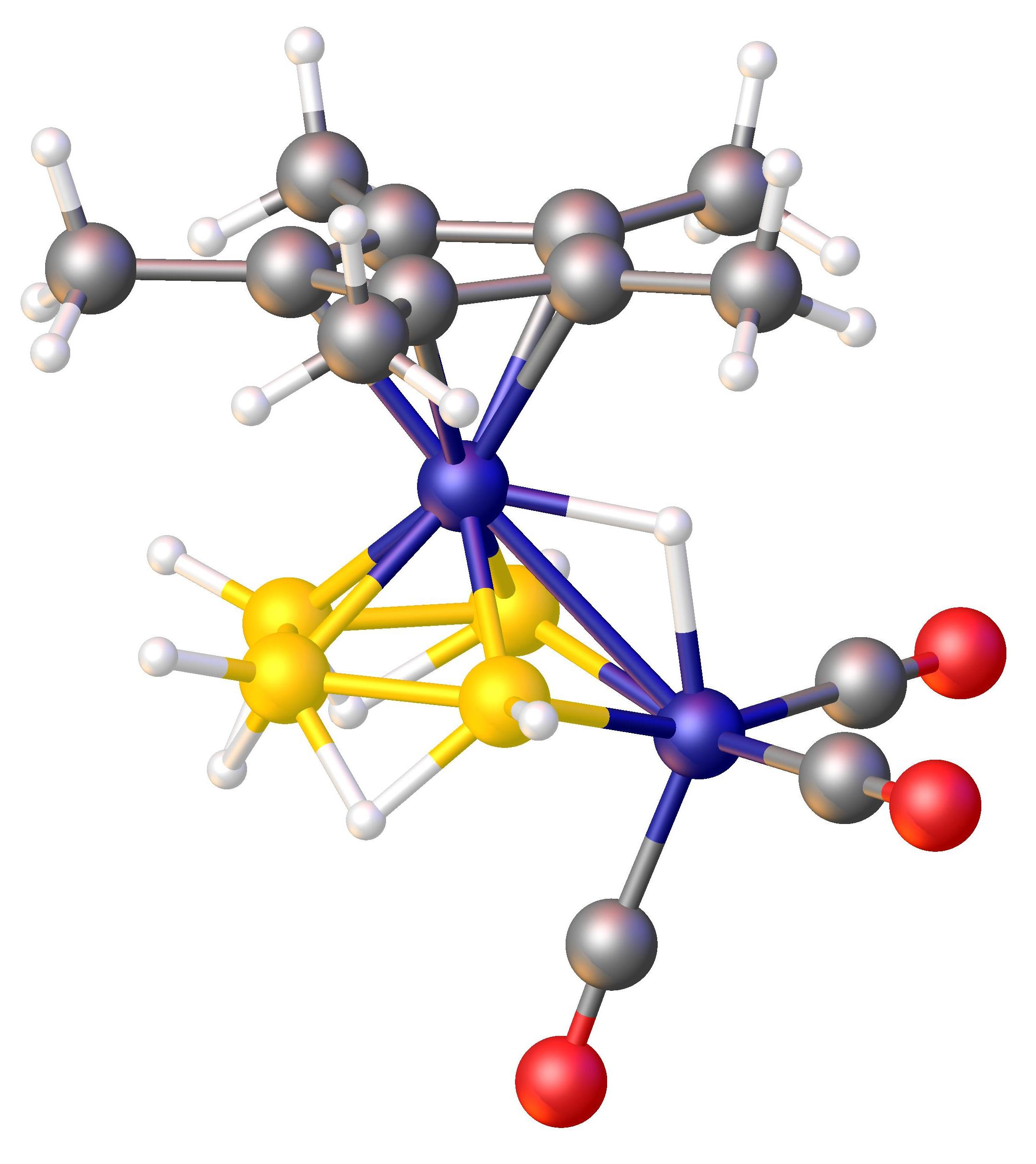
Structure of (C_{5}(CH_{3})_{5})FeHCo(CO)_{3}B_{4}H_{7}. Color code: yellow = B, blue = Fe & Co, red = O, gray = C.

In chemistry, a metalloborane is a compound that contains one or more metal atoms and one or more boron hydride unit. These compounds are related conceptually and often synthetically to the boron-hydride clusters by replacement of BH_{n} units – sometimes called vertices – with metal-containing fragments. Often these metal fragments are derived from metal carbonyls or cyclopentadienyl complexes. Their structures can often be rationalized by polyhedral skeletal electron pair theory. The inventory of these compounds is large, and their structures can be quite complicated.

== Examples ==
Chemical structure of B_{4}H_{8}Fe(CO)_{3}. As is customary for boron hydrides, the lines drawn between B and H do not represent 2-center, 2-electron bonds.

Two simple examples are B_{4}H_{8}Fe(CO)_{3} and B_{4}H_{8}Co(C_{5}H_{5}). The MB_{4} cores (M = Fe or Co) of these two compounds adopt structures expected for nido 5-vertex clusters. The iron compound is produced by reaction of diiron nonacarbonyl with pentaborane. B_{4}H_{8}Fe(CO)_{3} and cyclobutadieneiron tricarbonyl have similar structures.

=== Metallacarboranes ===
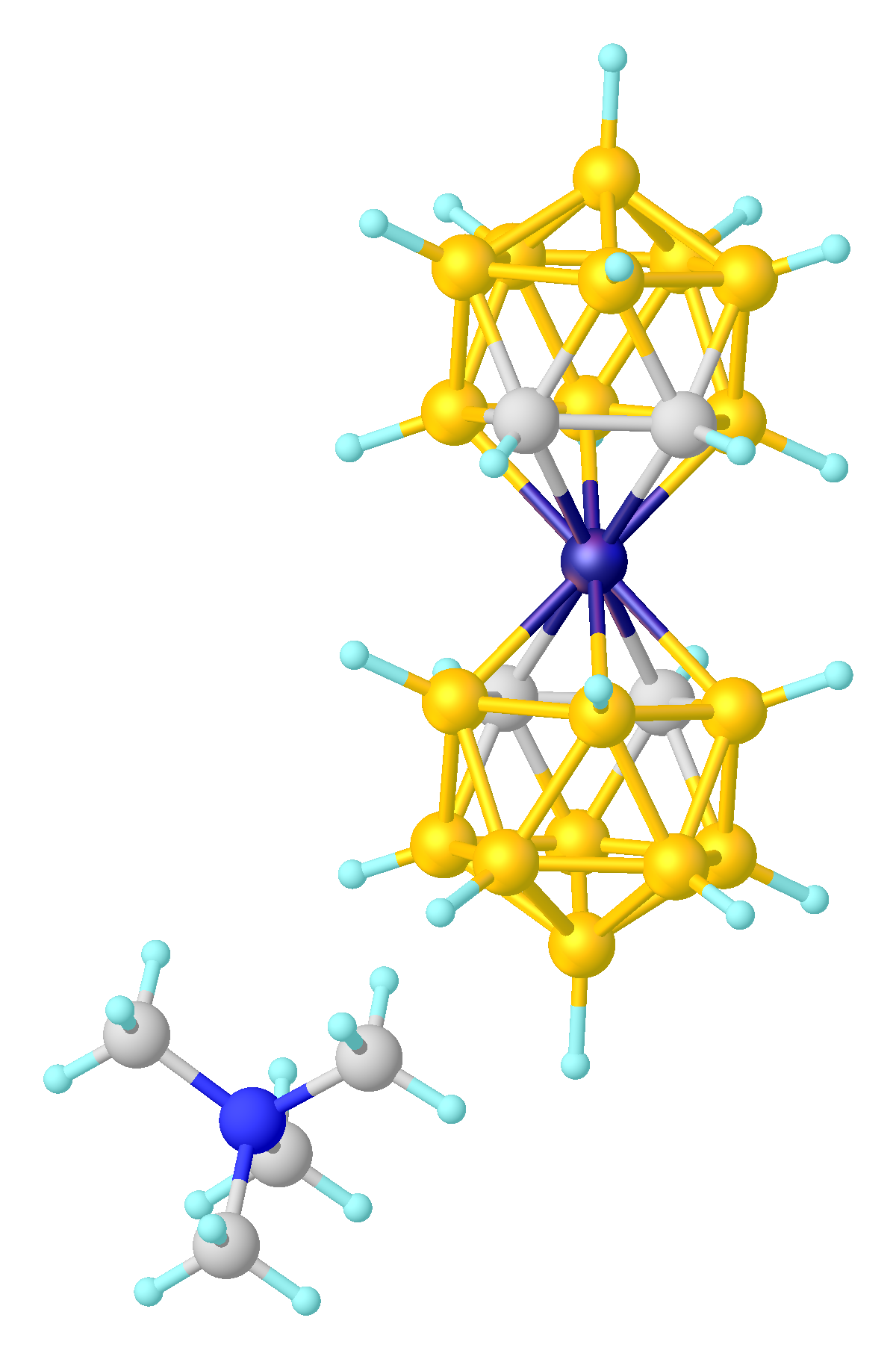
Structure of (Me_{4}N^{+})_{2}[Fe(C_{2}B_{9}H_{11})_{2}]^{2−}, showing only one Me_{4}N^{+}.

Even greater in scope than metalloboranes are metallacarboranes. These cages have carbon vertices, often CH, in addition to BH and M vertices. A well-developed class of metallacarboranes are prepared from dicarbollides, anions of the formula [C_{2}B_{9}H_{11}]^{2−}. These anions function as ligands for a variety of metals, often forming sandwich complexes.

Some metalloboranes are derived by the metalation of neutral carboranes. Illustrative are the six-and seven-vertex cages prepared from closo-C_{2}B_{3}H_{5}. Reaction of this carborane with iron carbonyl sources gives closo Fe- and Fe_{2}-containing products, according to these idealized equations:

C_{2}B_{3}H_{5} + Fe_{2}(CO)_{9} → C_{2}B_{3}H_{5}Fe(CO)_{3} + Fe(CO)_{5} + CO
C_{2}B_{3}H_{5}Fe(CO)_{3} + Fe_{2}(CO)_{9} → C_{2}B_{3}H_{5}(Fe(CO)_{3})_{2} + Fe(CO)_{5} + CO

A further example of insertion into a closo carborane is the synthesis of the yellow-orange closo-1,2,3-(CO)_{3}FeC_{2}B_{4}H_{6}:

closo-C_{2}B_{4}H_{8} + Fe_{2}(CO)_{9} → closo-(CO)_{3}FeC_{2}B_{4}H_{6} + Fe(CO)_{5} + CO

A closely related reaction involves the capping of an anionic nido carborane C_{2}B_{4}H^{−}_{7}

closo-C_{2}B_{4}H_{8} + NaH → Na(nido-B_{4}H_{7}) + H_{2}
Na(nido-B_{4}H_{7}) + CoCl_{2} + NaC_{5}H_{5} → closo-(C_{5}H_{5})CoB_{4}H_{6} + 2 NaCl + …

The last reaction is worked up with acid and air.

== See also ==
- Metal complexes of borohydride, coordination complexes containing the borohydride (BH^{−}_{4}) ligand.
