= Mathilakam =

- Village
- Location in Kerala, India Mathilakam (India)
- Coordinates: 10.2922744°N 76.1653315°E
- Country: India
- State: Kerala
- District: Thrissur

Languages
  - Official: Malayalam, English
- Time zone: UTC+5:30 (IST)
- PIN: 680685
- Vehicle registration: 47
- Coastline: 0 kilometres (0 mi)
- Nearest city: Kodungallur, Irinjalakkuda
- Avg. summer temperature: 35 °C (95 °F)
- Avg. winter temperature: 20 °C (68 °F)

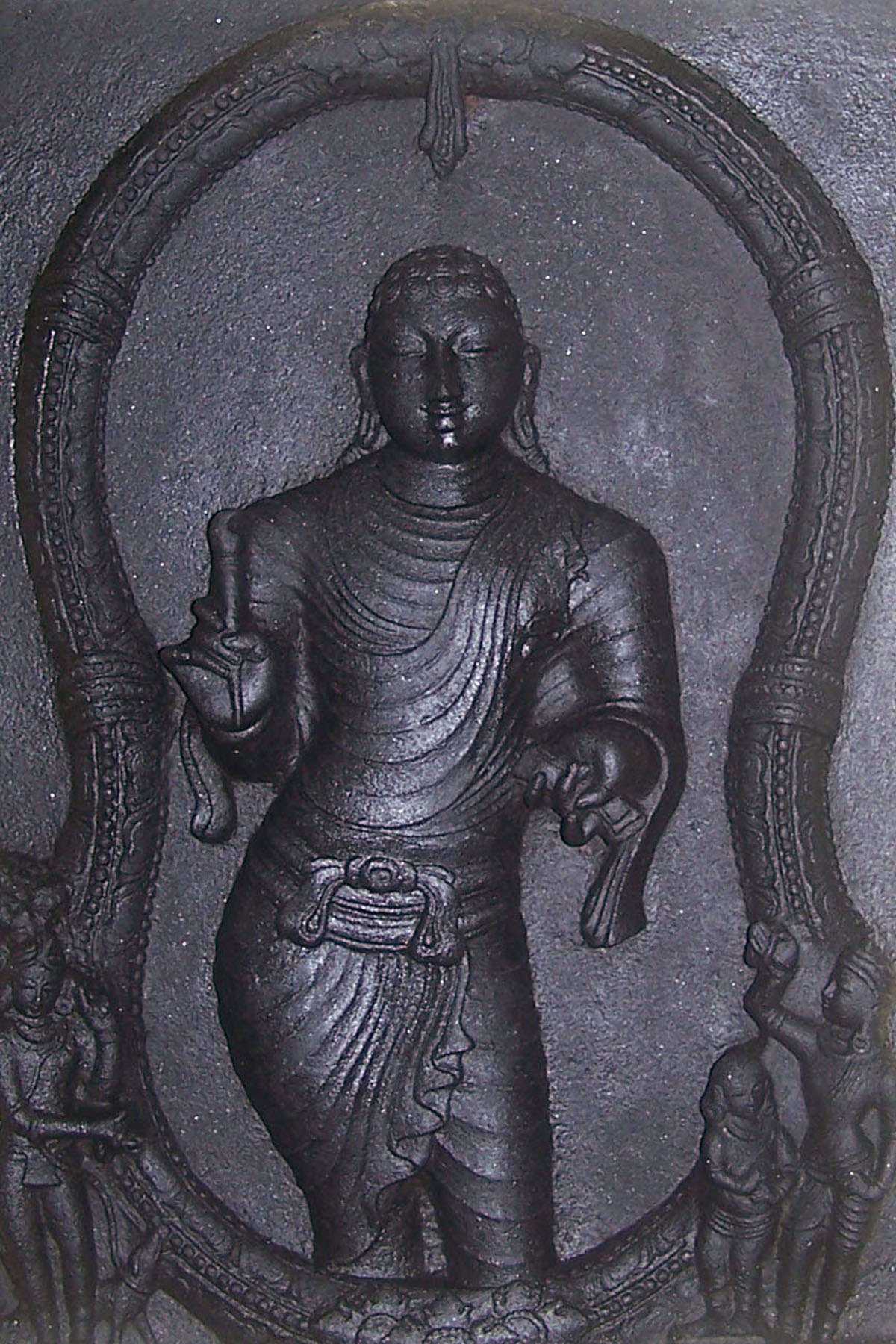
Ilango Adikal

Mathilakam is a village in Kodungallur taluk, in the Thrissur district of Kerala, southern India. It is located approximately 5 miles north of Kodungallur along National Highway 66. Nearby localities include SN Puram and Panangad. The village is situated on the route leading to Triprayar or Irinjalakuda.

Mathilakam is generally recognized by historians as the site of a medieval Jain vihara known as the Thirukkunavay or Thrikkana Mathilakam Temple. Thirukkunavay Temple, in turn, is often identfied with Kunavayir Kottam, the monastery of Ilamko Adikal, the author of the medieval Tamil epic Chilappathikaram. It appears that by 15th century, the Thirukkunavay Temple had been converted into a Shiva temple (Kokasandesa; slokas 45-48). The temple was probably completely destroyed during the late medieval period.

At Madilakam...the excavation revealed a 1.7 metres thick occupation overlying the natural sand. Several massive walls of laterite were exposed, one of which measuring 1.12 metres in breadth was traced to a length of 12 metres. The structure-complex seems to belong to the temple. The occurrence in the lower-half of the deposit of the sturdy red ware, the Chinese Celadon Ware and Chola coins would date the site to the 10th-11th centuries AD. The coins bear the familiar Chola characteristics, viz., the standing king on one side and the seated goddess on the other. Besides, hundreds of small earthen lamps were picked up from this site which might indicate that the venue was probably that of the temple, though this needs further confirmation. Another important find in this area was the outer wall of Madilakam, on the south extremity of the village. The wall was found to be running in the east-west direction and probably extended up to the backwaters on the east.

— Indian Archaeology 1969-70: A Review (Archaeological Survey of India)

Excavations were carried out by Archaeological Survey of India (ASI) at Mathilakam in 1967. Further excavations by the ASI in 1970 revealed an 8th–9th century AD foundation in the traditional temple compound at Mathilakam, structurally distinct from typical Kerala Hindu temple foundations in its design. Two coins of the Chola emperor Rajaraja were also discovered there.

In 2014, the Kerala State Archaeological Department conducted a field survey at Mathilakam. In 2020, the Archaeological Survey of India granted a licence to a non-profit trust to undertake further excavations at the site. The first phase of these excavations began with the opening of six trial trenches, and the trial phase was completed later that year.
