= Dodecaborate =

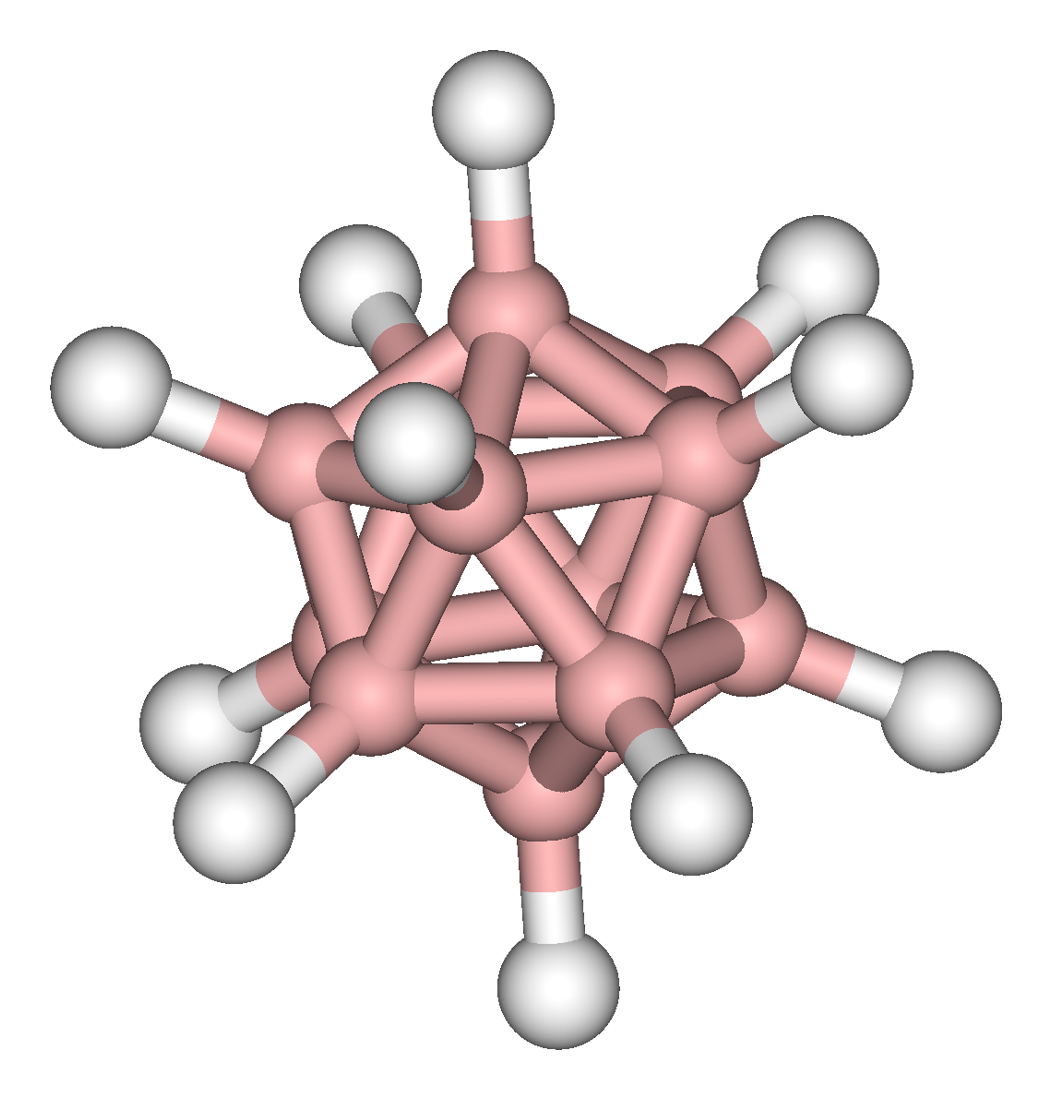

Names
- Other names: Dodecahydrododecaborate(2-); Dodecahydro-closo-dodecaborate(2−)

Identifiers
CAS Number	12356-13-7
3D model (JSmol)	Interactive image; Interactive image
ChEBI	CHEBI:33594
Gmelin Reference	3407
- InChI: InChI=1S/B12H12/c1-2-3(1)5(1)6(1)4(1,2)8(2)7(2,3)9(3,5)11(5,6)10(4,6,8)12(7,8,9)11/h1-12H/q-2 Key: CHOGGIOVKODKET-UHFFFAOYSA-N
- SMILES: [BH-]1234[BH]5%12%13[BH]1%10%11[BH]289[BH]367[BH]145[BH]6%14%15[BH]78%16[BH]9%10%17[BH]%11%12%18[BH]1%13%14[BH-]%15%16%17%18; [BH]1234[BH]567[BH]189[BH]2%10%11[BH]8%12%13[BH]%10%14%15[BH]%16%17%18[BH]35([BH]6%16%19[BH]%12%14%17[BH-]79%13%19)[BH-]4%11%15%18

Properties
Chemical formula	B_{12}H^{2−}_{12}
Molar mass	141.9504 g/mol
- Except where otherwise noted, data are given for materials in their standard state (at 25 °C [77 °F], 100 kPa). Infobox references

The dodecaborate(12) anion, [B_{12}H_{12}]^{2−}, is a boron hydride cluster anion. It forms a variety of colorless salts with alkali metal and quaternary ammonium cations. The cluster has a distinctive icosahedral structure with 12 boron atoms at the vertices, each boron atom is attached to a hydrogen atom. Its symmetry is classified by the molecular point group I_{h}.

== Synthesis and reactions ==
The existence of the dodecaborate(12) anion, [B_{12}H_{12}]^{2−}, was predicted by H. C. Longuet-Higgins and M. de V. Roberts in 1955. Hawthorne and Pitochelli first made it 5 years later, by the reaction of 2-iododecaborane with triethylamine in benzene solution at 80 °C. It is more conveniently prepared in two steps from sodium borohydride. First the borohydride is converted into a triborate anion using the etherate of boron trifluoride:

5 NaBH_{4} + BF_{3} → 2 NaB_{3}H_{8} + 3 NaF + 2 H_{2}

Pyrolysis of the triborate gives the twelve-boron cluster as the sodium salt. A variety of other synthetic methods have been published.

Salts of the dodecaborate ion are stable in air and do not react with hot aqueous sodium hydroxide or hydrochloric acid. The anion can be electrochemically oxidised to [B_{24}H_{23}]^{3−}.

== Substituted derivatives ==
Salts of B_{12}H^{2−}_{12} undergo hydroxylation with hydrogen peroxide to give salts of [B_{12}(OH)_{12}]^{2−}. The hydrogen atoms in the ion [B_{12}H_{12}]^{2−} can be replaced by the halogens with various degrees of substitution. The following numbering scheme is used to identify the products. The first boron atom is numbered 1, then the closest ring of five atoms around it is numbered anticlockwise from 2 to 6. The next ring of boron atoms is started from 7 for the atoms closest to number 2 and 3, and counts anticlockwise to 11. The atom opposite the original is numbered 12. A related derivative is [B_{12}(CH_{3})_{12}]^{2−}. The icosahedron of boron atoms is aromatic in nature.

Under kilobar pressure of carbon monoxide [B_{12}H_{12}]^{2−} reacts to form the carbonyl derivatives [B_{12}H_{11}CO]^{−} and the 1,12- and 1,7-isomers of B_{12}H_{10}(CO)_{2}. The para disubstitution at the 1,12 is unusual. In water the dicarbonyls appear to form carboxylic ions: [B_{12}H_{10}(CO)CO_{2}H]^{−} and [B_{12}H_{10}(CO_{2}H)_{2}]^{2−}.

A perfluoroborane derivative (with the hydrogen atoms replaced by fluorine atoms) is also known.

== Proposed applications ==
Compounds based on the ion [B_{12}H_{12}]^{2−} have been evaluated for solvent extraction of the radioactive ions ^{152}Eu^{3+} and ^{241}Am^{3+}.

[B_{12}H_{12}]^{2−}, [B_{12}(OH)_{12}]^{2−} and [B_{12}(OMe)_{12}]^{2−} was investigated for use in drug delivery.

Salts of [B_{12}H_{12}]^{2−} have been proposed for use in boron neutron capture therapy. The closo-dodecaborate increase the specificity of neutron irradiation treatment. Neutron irradiation of boron-10 leads to the emission of an alpha particle near the tumor.
