= Dicarbollide =

- Numbering system for nido-11 vertex clusters.

Identifiers
3D model (JSmol)	Interactive image
- InChI: InChI=1S/C2H11B9/c1-2-4-5-3(1)7(1)6(1,2)8(2,4)10(4,5)9(3,5,7)11(6,7,8)10/h1-11H/q-2 Key: JVDACFRPVHVFFP-UHFFFAOYSA-N
- SMILES: [B-H]1234[BH]5%12%13[B-H]1%10%11[BH]289[BH]367[BH]145[BH]6%14[BH]78[BH]9%10[CH]%11%12[CH]1%13%14

Properties
Chemical formula	C_{2}H_{11}B_{9}^{−}
Molar mass	132.40 g·mol^{−1}
- Except where otherwise noted, data are given for materials in their standard state (at 25 °C [77 °F], 100 kPa). Infobox references

In organometallic chemistry, a dicarbollide is an anion of the formula [C_{2}B_{9}H_{11}]^{2-}. Various isomers exist, but most common is 1,2-dicarbollide derived from ortho-carborane. These dianions function as ligands, related to the cyclopentadienyl anion. Substituted dicarbollides are also known such as [C_{2}B_{9}H_{10}(pyridine)]^{−} (pyridine bonded to B) and [C_{2}R_{2}B_{9}H_{9}]^{2-} (R groups bonded to carbon).

== Synthesis of dicarbollides ==
Dicarbollides are obtained by base-degradation of 12-vertex dicarboranes. This degradation of the ortho derivative has been most heavily studied. The conversion is conducted in two-steps, first "deboronation" and second deprotonation:

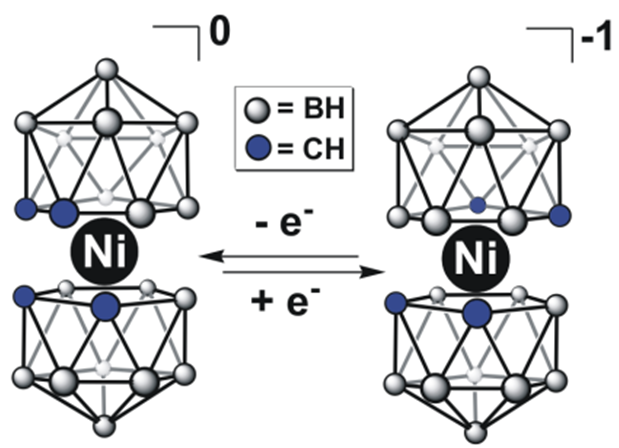
Reversible redox chemistry of Ni(III)/Ni(IV) bis(dicarbollide) clusters

C_{2}B_{10}H_{12} + NaOEt + 2 EtOH → Na^{+}C_{2}B_{9}H_{12}^{−} + H_{2} + B(OEt)_{3}
Na^{+}C_{2}B_{9}H_{12}^{−} + NaH → Na_{2}C_{2}B_{9}H_{11} + H_{2}

The dianion derived from dicarboranes, [C_{2}B_{9}H_{11}]^{2-}, are nido clusters. Three isomers exist. Most commonly studies is the 7,8-isomer, with two adjacent carbon centers on the rim. 7,9-C_{2}B_{9}H^{2−}_{11} has non-adjacent carbon centers on the rim. It is derived by degradation of meta-C_{2}B_{10}H_{12}. 2,9-C_{2}B_{9}H^{2−}_{11} has only one carbon center on the rim. It is derived by degradation of para-C_{2}B_{10}H_{12}.

== Coordination compounds ==
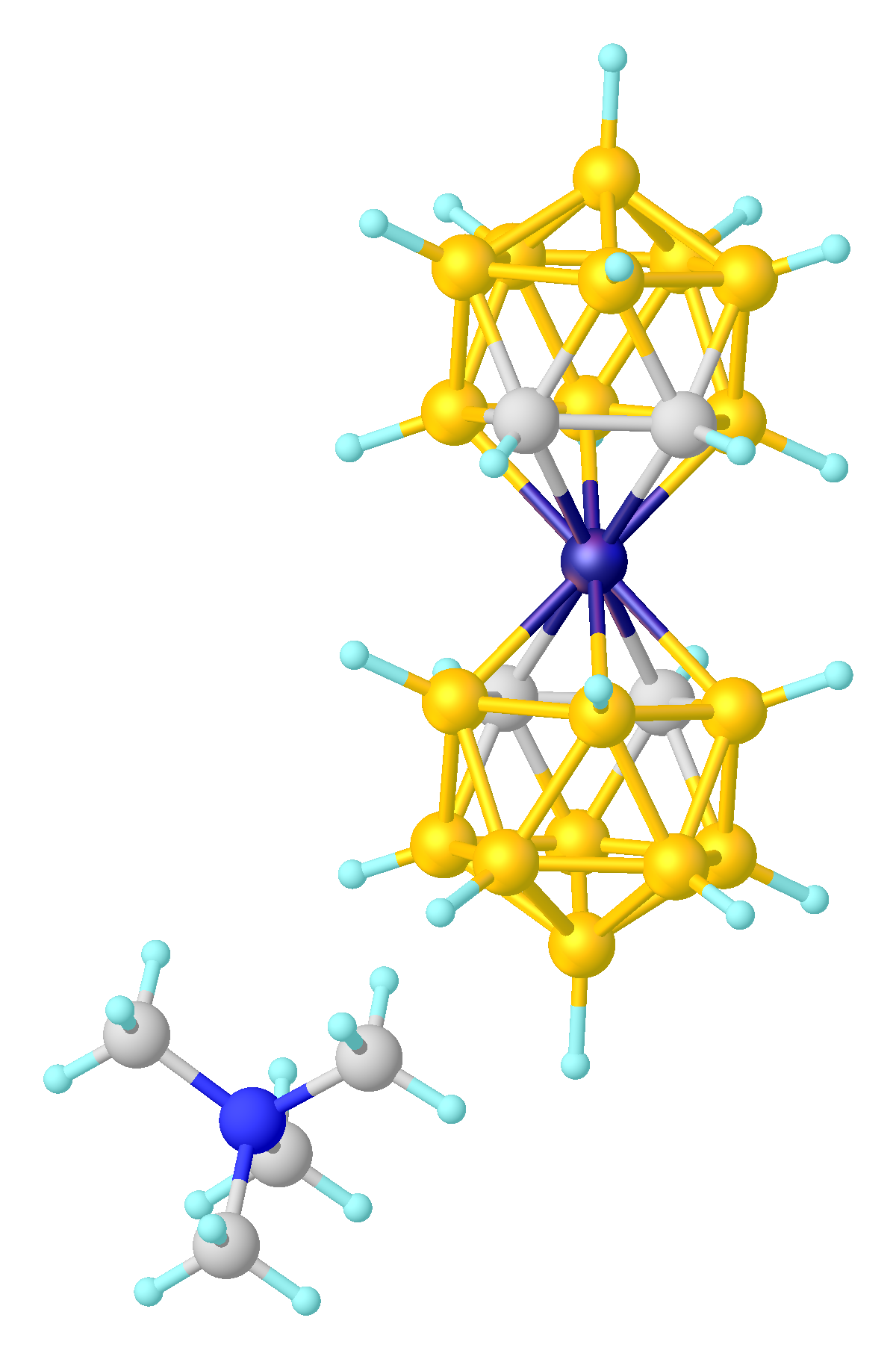
Structure of (Me_{4}N^{+})_{2}[Fe(C_{2}B_{9}H_{11})_{2}]^{2-}, showing only one Me_{4}N^{+}.

A variety of complexes - a subset of metallaborane - are known with one or two dicarbollide ligands. An example of a 1:1 complex is [Mn(CO)_{3}(η^{5}-7,8-C_{2}B_{9}H_{11})]^{−}.

Most heavily studied are complexes with two dicarbollide ligands, especially sandwich complexes. Thus, these are prepared by salt metathesis reactions, as illustrated by the synthesis of the ferrocene analogue:

2 Na_{2}C_{2}B_{8}H_{11} + FeCl_{2} → Na_{2}[Fe(C_{2}B_{8}H_{11})_{2}] + 2 NaCl

These bisdicarbollide dianions are often readily oxidized. Fe(III), Co(III), Ni(III), and Ni(IV) derivatives are known. In some cases, the oxidation induces rearrangement of the C_{2}B_{9} cage to give complexes where the carbon centers are nonadjacent.

== Precursor to other carboranes ==
Diprotonation of [C_{2}B_{9}H_{11}]^{2−} gives the neutral carborane C_{2}B_{9}H_{13}. Pyrolysis of this nido cluster gives closo-C_{2}B_{9}H_{11}. Chromate-oxidation of [C_{2}B_{9}H_{12}]^{−} results in deboronation, giving the C_{2}B_{7}H_{13}. This carborane features two CH_{2} vertices.

== Homogeneous catalysis ==
The clam-shell dicarbollide complex (Cp*)(C_{2}B_{9}H_{11})ZrCH_{3} catalyzes alkene polymerization.
