= Boron neutron capture therapeutics =

Pharmaceuticals to target cancerous cells

Boron neutron capture therapeutics are pharmaceuticals intended for use to deliver boron-10 to cancerous cells as part of boron neutron capture therapy (BNCT). Boron-10 atoms strongly absorb neutrons to form a metastable state of boron-11, which undergoes α-decay. By accumulating boron-10 in cancerous cells and subjecting the tumor to neutron radiation, high-energy α particles are selectively delivered only to the target cells. This neutron bombardment results in the selective destruction of the tumor cells that the boron-10 was absorbed into. As of 2023, the technology is available in Japan only, and even there few implementations have been reported.

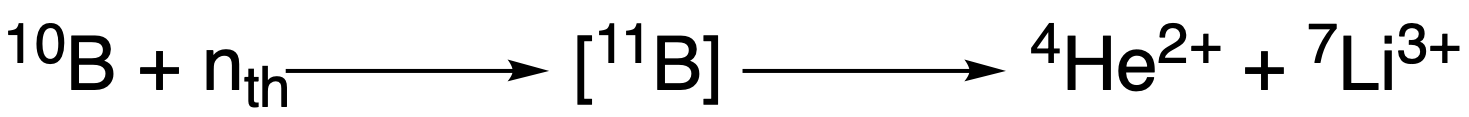
Boron-10 neutron capture scheme

== Initial proposal and development ==
Neutron capture therapy (NCT) was first proposed in the literature in 1936 by Gordon L. Locher, who observed that isotopes with large neutron capture cross sections, such as boron-10, could be accumulated in cancerous tissue and bombarded with thermal neutrons to induce destruction of the cancerous cells. Boron was seen as a qualified candidate for NCT because the alpha particles of ^{10}B (^{4}He^{2+}), produced from boron's reaction with a neutron beam, can induce apoptosis with a relatively tight travel radius about the diameter of a cell. The proposition was that boron-10 containing delivery agents would take advantage of properties of cancer cells that are not present in normal tissue cells, such as overexpression of certain enzymes or the lack of blood brain barrier. This idea was attractive because it had the potential to be more selective than traditional chemo- and radiotherapies. However, BNCT requires a neutron beam to act as a source of thermal neutrons and a suitable boron-delivery agent; neither was available at the time of Locher's suggestion. Therefore, it was not until the 1950s, when nuclear reactors were available, that Locher's proposal was put into practice. Since neutrons have a low penetration range, only about 2–3 cm below the skin's surface, BNCT was proposed for head and neck cancers.

== Boron delivery agents ==
=== Requirements for boron delivery agents ===
A BNCT therapeutic candidate must selectively accumulate the boron-10 in target tissue without significant uptake in normal tissue. If selectivity is low and boron accumulates in both, irradiation with thermal neutrons will cause significant damage to healthy tissue; if boron accumulates in neither, the treatment will be ineffective. Selectivity is quantified by the tumor/normal tissue boron ratio, which compares the concentration of boron atoms in tumor cells with that in the patient's healthy cells. A large tumor/normal tissue ratio (~3 or greater) is necessary. In addition, boron must remain in target tissue at significant concentrations (~20 μg/g) for long enough that concentration in the blood drops to low levels (generally several hours). Boron delivery agents should have high solubility to be efficiently circulated and effectively penetrate tumor tissues. These candidates must also minimize toxicity to and have rapid clearance from healthy tissues.

=== Early candidates ===
Early work in the 1950s made use of widely available non-toxic boron compounds such as sodium borate (also known as borax) and boric acid. Sodium borate was used to treat nearly a dozen patients with BNCT through a collaboration between Massachusetts General Hospital and Brookhaven National Laboratory. The results were inconclusive, and lack of success was blamed on the short lifetime of the tumor:normal tissue differential. These early candidates relied on passive diffusion to accumulate in tumor cells, a non-selective process that resulted in the non-specific distribution between normal and tumor tissue.

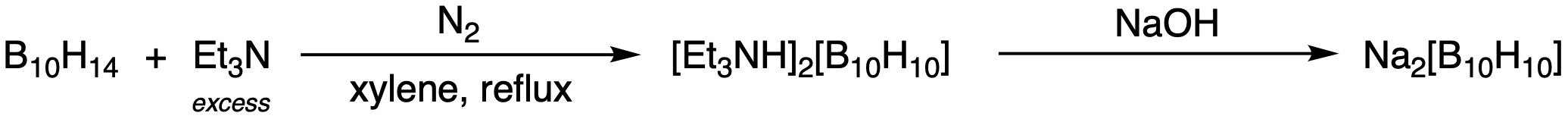
Simplified scheme showing the synthesis of the sodium salt of the decahydrodecaborate anion.

Seeking to improve selectivity through chemical modification, studies were performed to correlate lipid solubility with penetration of the blood-brain barrier in mice. It was determined that compounds with high solubility in benzene are more capable of penetrating the brain, and should thus be avoided as BNCT therapeutics. Based on this data, boron-10 enriched samples of p-carboxyphenylboronic acid (PCPB) and sodium decahydrodecaborate (Na_{2}B_{10}H_{10}) were selected for BNCT at the Massachusetts Institute of Technology research reactor. The therapy was performed on eighteen patients before the realization that patients were receiving severe radiation damage to normal tissue ended the trial. Later analysis established the likely cause of death as radiation necrosis for at least nine patients, and the study has been described as a “total failure”. Radiation necrosis was attributed to fission of boron-10 atoms in the bloodstream, damaging adjacent blood vessels. PCPB and Na_{2}B_{10}H_{10} had been selected for their promising tumor:normal tissue differentials; however, the concentration of boron-10 in patients’ blood was not considered as significant a concern until after these results.

=== Second-generation boron delivery agents ===
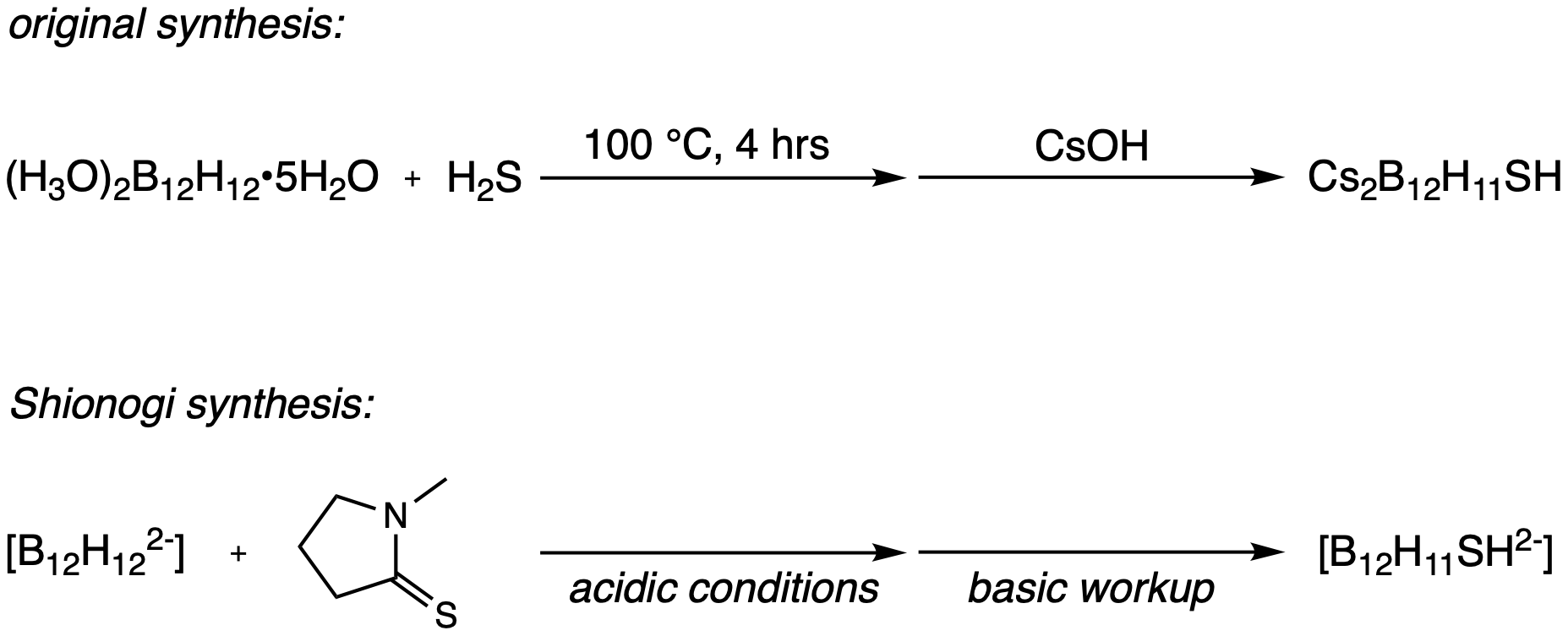
Schemes showing synthetic routes to BSH

Building on the dodecaborane anion ([B_{12}H_{12}]^{2-}) discovered in part by M. Frederick Hawthorne, Earl Muetterties et al. developed the monosubstituted derivative sodium borocaptate (BSH, Na_{2}B_{12}H_{11}SH). While screening boron compounds for use in BNCT, it was discovered that BSH and other monosubstituted sulfhydryl boron hydride clusters accumulate in cancerous cells without lingering in the blood stream — exactly the properties needed for new BNCT therapeutics. It has been theorized that the thiol moiety (sulfur equivalent of an alcohol group) present in BSH plays a role in the differing biological uptake properties between [B_{12}H_{12}]^{2-} and BSH, though more research must be done to understand the relevant biochemistry.

Although clinical work with BNCT in the United States was paused for decades after the MIT reactor experiments, BNCT continued in Japan. Using BSH synthesized by the Shionogi pharmaceutical company, BNCT was used to treat over 200 patients by Hiroshi Hatanaka, Yoshinobu Nakagawa, and their colleagues. The success and efficacy of the Hatanaka/Nakagawa work has been debated, with some arguing that there was no significant improvement in patient outcomes; others argue, however, that critics are focusing on small subsamples of the patient population, and are not taking into account that neutron beams accessible to Hatanaka were much less powerful than those at Brookhaven and at MIT. Further studies have been carried out in the Netherlands and the Czech Republic, and BSH continues to be tested for BNCT.

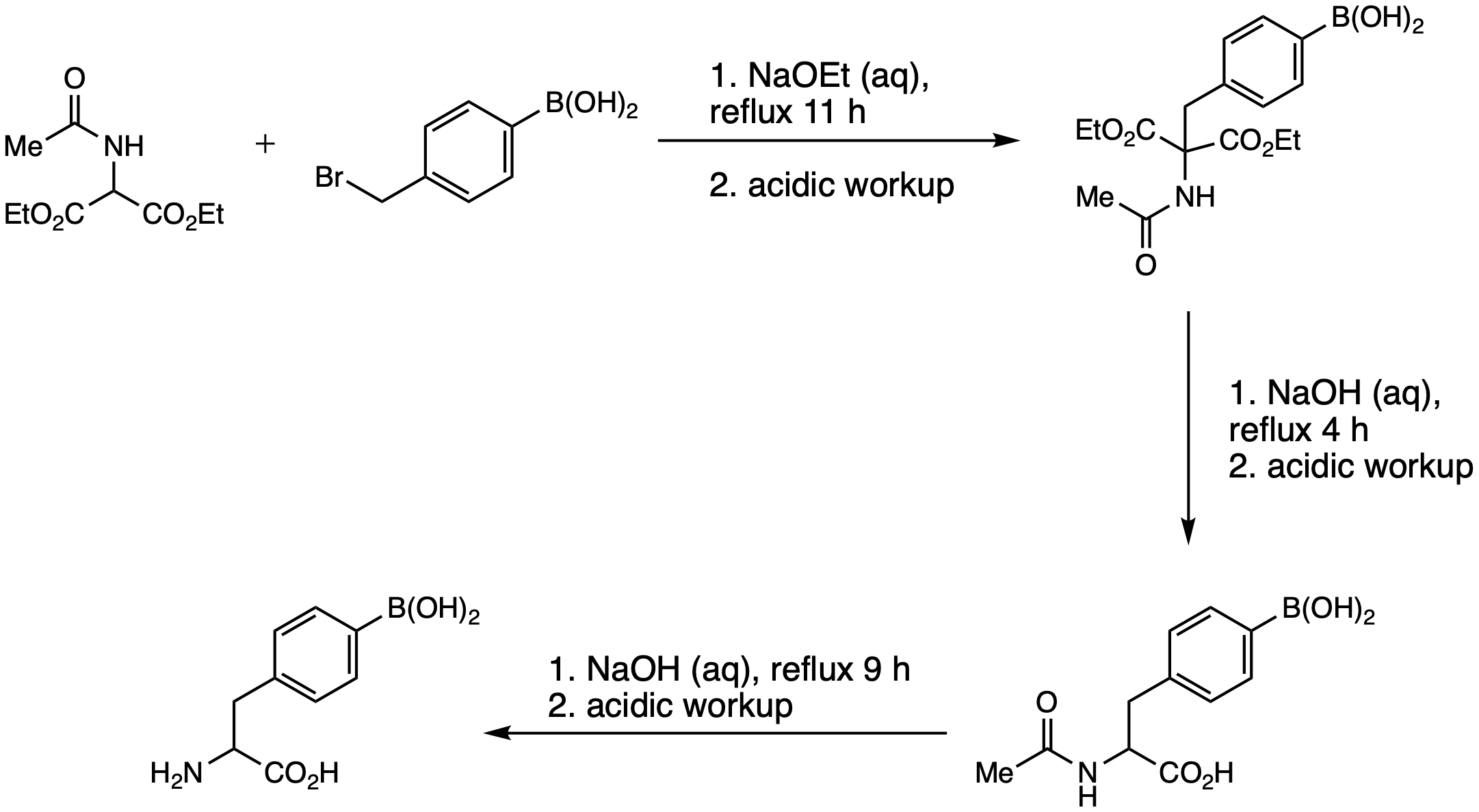
Scheme showing synthetic route to p-boronophenylalanine

First synthesized in 1958 by Snyder et al., boronophenylalanine (BPA) and its more water-soluble fructose complex (BPA-F) were not initially acknowledged as potential BNCT therapeutics. In the 1970s, however, BPA was proposed to target malignant melanomas with BNCT. Previous work on BNCT had only targeted cancers of the brain, using the blood-brain barrier to improve tumor:normal tissue differentials. Similarities between BPA and the precursor amino acids to melanin meant that melanomas may selectively accumulate BPA through LAT1 (L-type amino acid transporter 1) transporters that are excessively expressed in tumor cells. Clinical trials began again in the United States in the 1990s at Brookhaven and at MIT using BPA, both for melanomas and glioblastomas. In contrast with the Japanese BSH trials, higher-energy epithermal neutrons were used in place of thermal neutrons, allowing for deeper penetration into the brain without the need for neurosurgery during treatment. Further trials with BPA have been carried out in Finland, the Netherlands, Sweden, Taiwan, and Japan. In some trials, both BPA and BSH were used as the delivery agent, and some studies have tested the effectiveness of BNCT in conjunction with traditional chemo- and radiotherapies. The primary flaw with both BSH and BPA/BPA-F seems to be heterogeneity in distribution of boron-10 throughout the tumors. The unsatisfactory tumor-normal tissue ratio along with limited retention rimes are downfalls with BSH and BPA for use as boron delivery agents.

=== Third-generation boron delivery agents ===
As alternatives to BSH and BPA, "third-generation boron delivery agents" are marked by inclusion of a specific chemical tumor-targeting moiety, often borrowed from those established in chemotherapy, linked to a boron-carrying compound. These targeted drug delivery systems are designed to bind the delivery agent to chemical sites found in tumor cells, rather than relying on secondary properties such as hydrophilicity; the use of BPA to target melanomas was an early example. Third-generation agents are also multifunctional, with cancer-targeting and imaging capabilities. Examples of compounds derivativized for BNCT include "peptides, proteins, antibodies, nucleosides, sugars, porphyrins, liposomes and nanoparticles." Nanoparticles conjugated with boron-containing compounds can target tumor-specific receptors and accumulate in cancer cells. One aspect that is being taken advantage of is the increased uptake of glucose in tumors compared to normal cells. This increase in glucose is due to the upregulated anaerobic glycolysis required in tumor cells, allowing for glucose transporters (GLUT) to be targeted by boron compounds to increase selectivity of tumor cells. Monoclonal antibodies are also being engineered to take advantage of antigens that are overexpressed in tumor cells to increase the tumor-normal tissue ratio. The use of engineered antibodies can allow specificity to patients based on their unique antigenic profiles. While animal and in vitro studies have shown potential, no third-generation boron delivery agent has yet been used in a clinical trial.

== Clinical studies ==
Early clinical tests of boron-neutron capture treatment in the 1950s and 1960s in the US were discontinued due to poor outcomes. Part of the poor outcomes in the early studies was due to the very large doses of neutrons required in the treatments. Following some success from trials in Japan, trials with powerful but focused epithermal neutron beams began in the late 1990s in the US and Europe. Complexity and cost of the boron-based neutron technique lead to loss of funding by around 2000. Some studies using accelerator generated epithermal neutrons continue.

== Research ==
The availability of accelerator-based BNCT sites allows more opportunities to test BNCT. New therapeutics are also being developed. Future developments are focusing on combining BNCT with other therapies, increasing drug-water solubility and tumor retention, and utilizing BNCT in non-localities. The challenge of tumor heterogeneity is being researched to determine if the variable response to treatment can be addressed.
