= Phenylalanine (data page) =

Chemical data page

The complete data for Phenylalanine
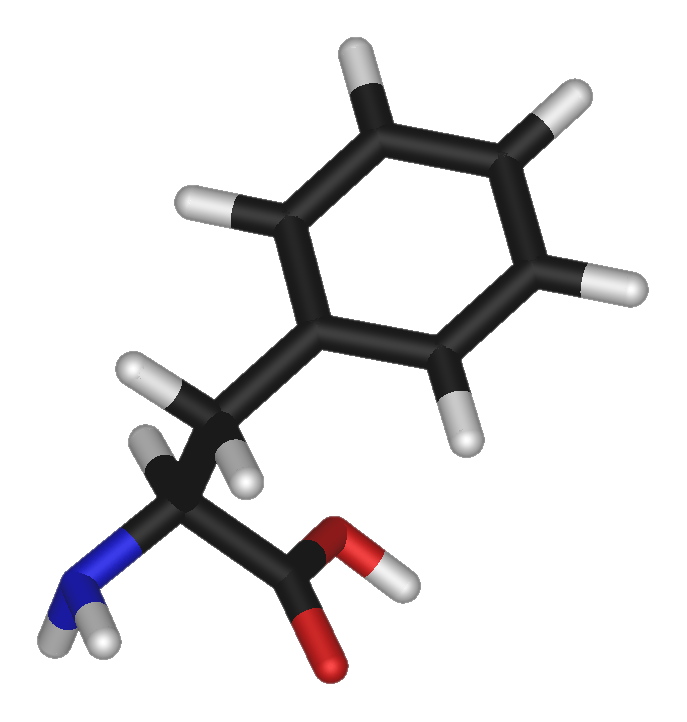
General information
Chemical formula: C_{9}H_{11}NO_{2}
Molar mass: 165.19 g·mol^{−1}
Systematic name:
2-Amino-3-phenyl-propanoic acid
Abbreviations: F, Phe
Synonyms:
alpha-Amino-beta-phenylpropionic acid
(2R)-2-amino-3- phenylpropanoic acid
(2S)-2-amino-3-phenylpropanoic acid
Database data
SMILES: C1=CC=C(C=C1)CC(C(=O)O)N
InChI=1/C9H11NO2/c10-8(9(11)12)6-7-4-2-1-3-5-7/h1-5,8H,6,10H2,(H,11,12)/t8-/m0/s1/f/h11H

| ATC: N/A | CAS: 673-06-3 (D), 63-91-2(L), 150-30-1 (DL) | DrugBank: N/A | EINECS: 211-603-5 ^{a}, 200-568-1 (D), 205-756-7 (L) | PubChem: 994 ^{a}, 71567 (D) ^{a} 6140 (L) ^{a} |

Physical properties

| Structure | Crystal data | Spectral data: UV-Vis / IR / NMR / MS: Masses of main fragments: GMD MS Spectrum |

| Phase behavior | Solid properties ρ_{solid}: 1.29 g.cm^{−3} T_{m}: 283 °C | Liquid properties | Gas properties |

Hazard properties

| MSDS N/A | Main hazards: N/A | NFPA 704 | Flash point: N/A | RTECS number: N/A |

Chemical properties

| XLogP: -1.496 | pI: 5.5 | pK_{a}: 2.20, 9.09 | Tautomers: | Hydrogen bond: donor - 2; acceptor - 3 |

Pharmacological properties

This box:
- Except where noted otherwise, data relate to Standard temperature and pressure.
- Reliability of data general note.
