= Phenylalanine =

Type of α-amino acid

- Skeletal formula Skeletal formula of L-phenylalanine

- L-Phenylalanine at physiological pH

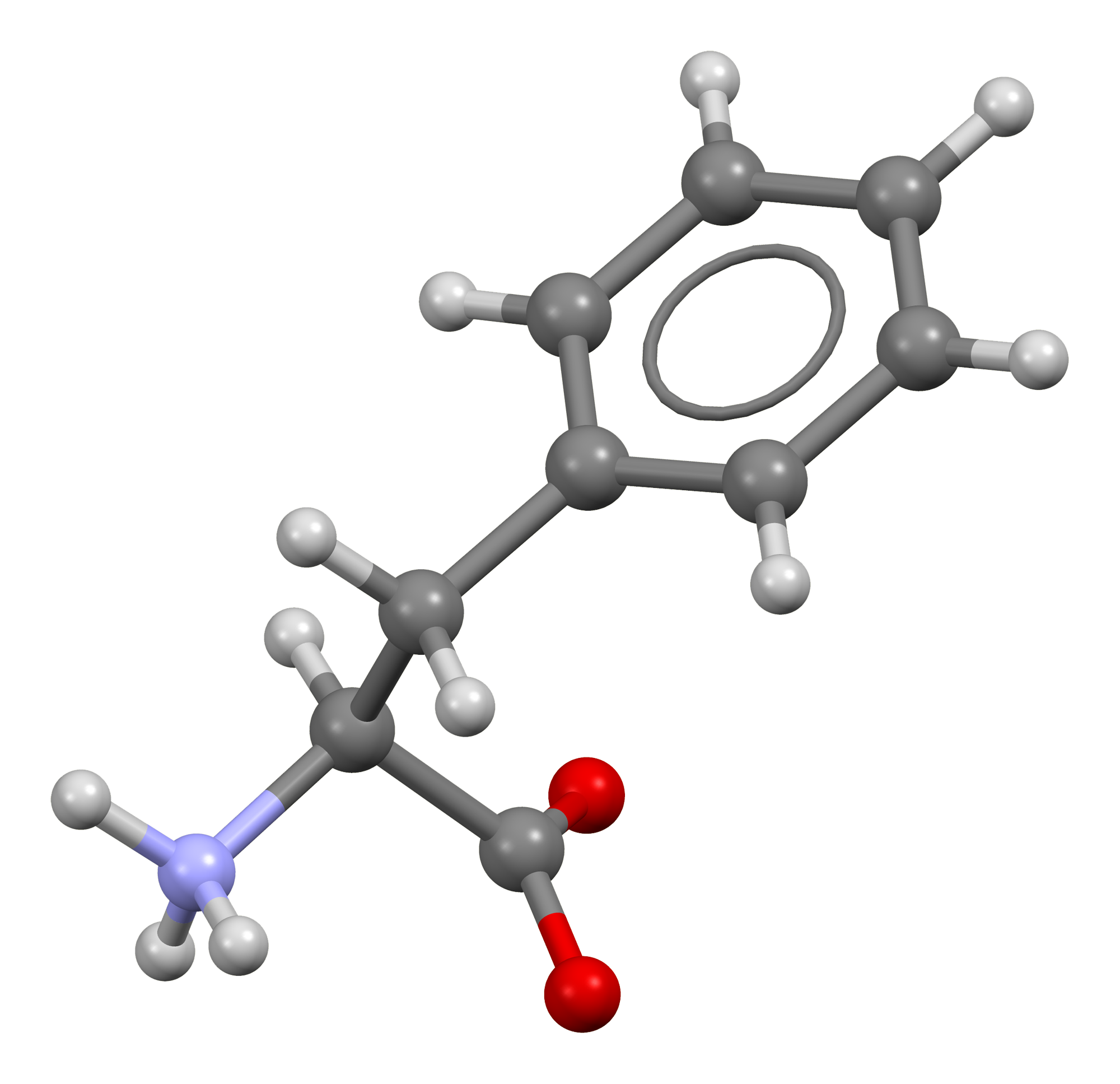
Ball-and-stick model
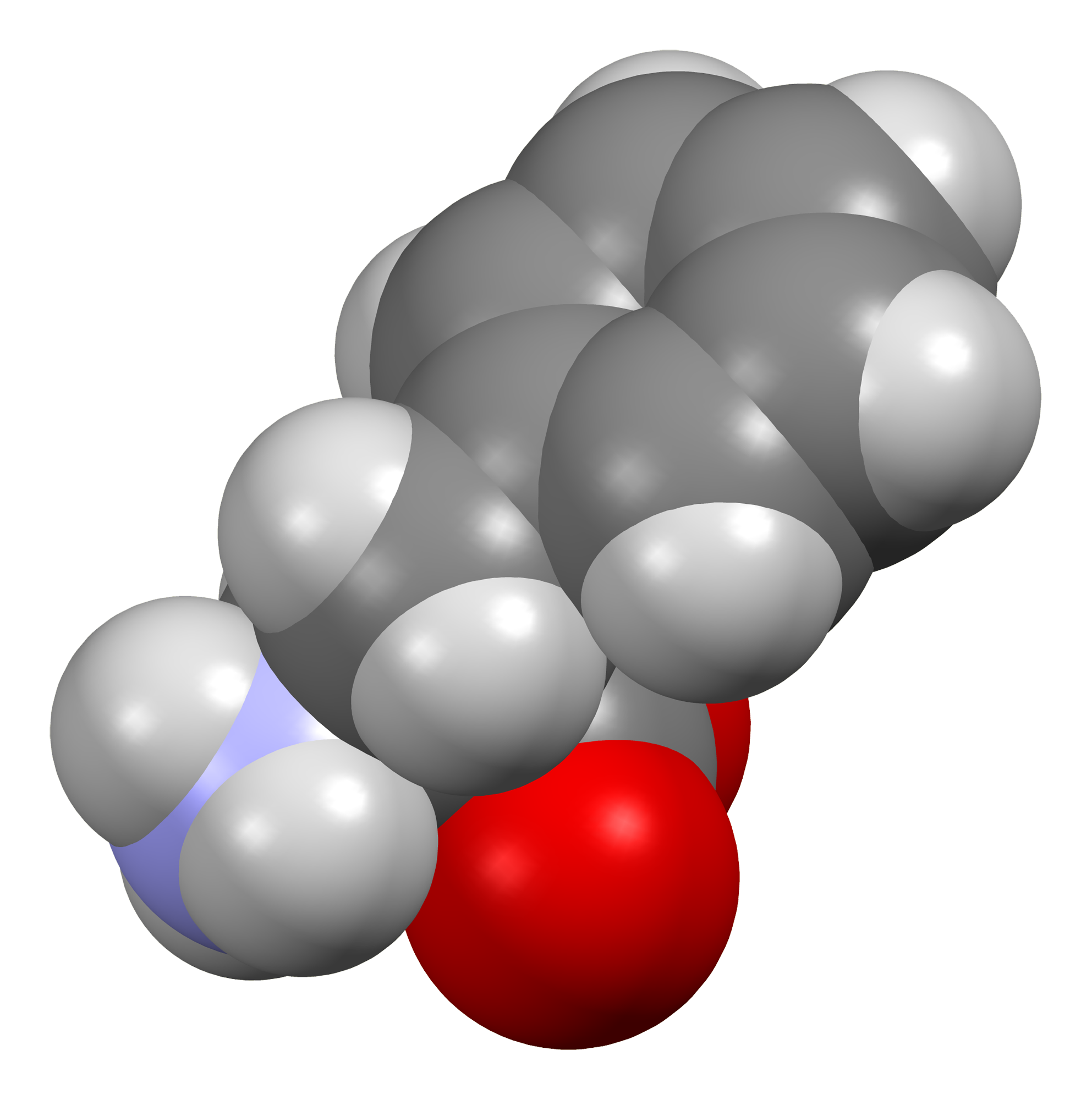
Space-filling model

Names
Pronunciation	US: /ˌfɛnəlˈæləniːn/; UK: /ˌfiːnaɪl-/
- IUPAC name Phenylalanine
- Systematic IUPAC name (S)-2-Amino-3-phenylpropanoic acid

Identifiers
CAS Number	L: 63-91-2; D/L: 150-30-1; D: 673-06-3
3D model (JSmol)	L: Interactive image; D: Interactive image; L Zwitterion: Interactive image; D Zwitterion: Interactive image
ChEBI	L: CHEBI:17295; D/L: CHEBI:28044; D: CHEBI:16998
ChEMBL	L: ChEMBL301523
ChemSpider	L: 5910; D/L: 969; D: 64639
DrugBank	L: DB00120
ECHA InfoCard	100.000.517
IUPHAR/BPS	L: 3313
KEGG	L: D00021
PubChem CID	L: 6140; D/L: 994; D: 71567
UNII	L: 47E5O17Y3R; D/L: 8P946UF12S; D: 032K16VRCU
CompTox Dashboard (EPA)	L: DTXSID4040763
- InChI: InChI=1S/C9H11NO2/c10-8(9(11)12)6-7-4-2-1-3-5-7/h1-5,8H,6,10H2,(H,11,12)/t8-/m0/s1 Key: COLNVLDHVKWLRT-QMMMGPOBSA-N; L: Key: COLNVLDHVKWLRT-QMMMGPOBBC; D/L: Key: COLNVLDHVKWLRT-UHFFFAOYSA-N; D: Key: COLNVLDHVKWLRT-MRVPVSSYSA-N
- SMILES: L: c1ccc(cc1)C[C@@H](C(=O)O)N; D: c1ccc(cc1)C[C@H](C(=O)O)N; L Zwitterion: [NH3+][C@@H](CC1=CC=CC=C1)C([O-])=O; D Zwitterion: [NH3+][C@H](CC1=CC=CC=C1)C([O-])=O

Properties
Chemical formula	C_{9}H_{11}NO_{2}
Molar mass	165.192 g·mol^{−1}
Solubility in water	9.97 g/L at 0 °C 14.11 g/L at 25 °C; 21.87 g/L at 50 °C; 37.08 g/L at 75 °C; 68.9 g/L at 100 °C
Acidity (pK_{a})	1.83 (carboxyl), 9.13 (amino)

Hazards
NFPA 704 (fire diamond)	2 1 0

Supplementary data page
- Phenylalanine (data page)
- Except where otherwise noted, data are given for materials in their standard state (at 25 °C [77 °F], 100 kPa). Infobox references

Phenylalanine ball and stick model spinning

Phenylalanine (symbol Phe or F) is an α-amino acid with the formula C_{9}H_{11}NO_{2}. It is one of the four aromatic amino acids and the 21 proteinogenic amino acids common to all known life forms. It is also one of the nine essential amino acids. This means that humans and other animals cannot biosynthesize phenylalanine, so they must obtain it from dietary sources such as meat, dairy, eggs, and legumes. Phenylalanine is found naturally in the milk of mammals. It is used in the manufacture of food and drink products and sold as a nutritional supplement as it is a direct precursor to the neuromodulator phenethylamine.

It can be viewed as a benzyl group substituted for the methyl group of alanine, or a phenyl group in place of a terminal hydrogen of alanine. It is classified as neutral, and nonpolar because of the inert and hydrophobic nature of the benzyl side chain. The L-isomer is used to biochemically form proteins coded for by DNA. Phenylalanine is a precursor for tyrosine, the monoamine neurotransmitters dopamine, norepinephrine (noradrenaline), and epinephrine (adrenaline), and the biological pigment melanin. It is encoded by the messenger RNA codons UUU and UUC. The one-letter symbol F was assigned to phenylalanine for its phonetic similarity.

== History ==
The first description of phenylalanine was made in 1879, when Schulze and Barbieri identified a compound with the empirical formula, C_{9}H_{11}NO_{2}, in yellow lupine (Lupinus luteus) seedlings. In 1882, Erlenmeyer and Lipp first synthesized phenylalanine from phenylacetaldehyde, hydrogen cyanide, and ammonia.

The genetic codon for phenylalanine was first discovered by J. Heinrich Matthaei and Marshall W. Nirenberg in 1961. They showed that by using mRNA to insert multiple uracil repeats into the genome of the bacterium E. coli, they could cause the bacterium to produce a polypeptide consisting solely of repeated phenylalanine amino acids. This discovery helped to establish the nature of the coding relationship that links information stored in genomic nucleic acid with protein expression in the living cell.

== Dietary sources ==
Good sources of phenylalanine are eggs, chicken, liver, beef, milk, and soybeans. Another common source of phenylalanine is anything sweetened with the artificial sweetener aspartame, such as diet drinks, diet foods and medication; the metabolism of aspartame produces phenylalanine as one of the compound's metabolites.

== Dietary recommendations ==
The Food and Nutrition Board (FNB) of the U.S. Institute of Medicine set Recommended Dietary Allowances (RDAs) for essential amino acids in 2002. For phenylalanine plus tyrosine, for adults 19 years and older, 33 mg/kg body weight/day. In 2005, the DRI was set to 27 mg/kg per day (with no tyrosine), the FAO/WHO/UNU recommendation of 2007 is 25 mg/kg per day (with no tyrosine).

== Metabolism ==
As an essential amino acid, phenylalanine is not synthesized by animals, which must obtain it from dietary sources such as meat, dairy, eggs, and legumes. Bacteria, archaea, fungi, algae, some protozoans and plants biosynthesize phenylalanine via the shikimate pathway.

While animals cannot synthesize phenylalanine, they can break it down. Through an irreversible reaction, the liver enzyme phenylalanine hydroxylase (PAH) converts phenylalanine into tyrosine. L-Phenylalanine is biologically converted into L-tyrosine, another one of the DNA-encoded amino acids. L-tyrosine in turn is converted into L-DOPA, which is further converted into dopamine, norepinephrine (noradrenaline), and epinephrine (adrenaline). The latter three are known as the catecholamines.

Phenylalanine uses the same active transport channel as tryptophan to cross the blood–brain barrier. In excessive quantities, supplementation can interfere with the production of serotonin and other aromatic amino acids as well as nitric oxide due to the overuse (eventually, limited availability) of the associated cofactors, iron or tetrahydrobiopterin. The corresponding enzymes for those compounds are the aromatic amino acid hydroxylase family and nitric oxide synthase.

Biosynthetic pathways for catecholamines and trace amines in the human brain
Phenylalanine in humans may ultimately be metabolized into a range of different substances.

=== In plants ===
Phenylalanine is the starting compound used in the synthesis of flavonoids. Lignan is derived from phenylalanine and tyrosine. Phenylalanine is converted to cinnamic acid by the enzyme phenylalanine ammonia-lyase.

== Phenylketonuria ==
The genetic disorder phenylketonuria (PKU) is the inability to metabolize phenylalanine because of a lack of the enzyme phenylalanine hydroxylase. Individuals with this disorder are known as "phenylketonurics" and must regulate their intake of phenylalanine. Phenylketonurics often use blood tests to monitor the amount of phenylalanine in their blood. Lab results may report phenylalanine levels using either mg/dL and μmol/L. One mg/dL of phenylalanine is approximately equivalent to 60 μmol/L.

A (rare) "variant form" of phenylketonuria called hyperphenylalaninemia is caused by the inability to synthesize a cofactor called tetrahydrobiopterin, which can be supplemented. Pregnant women with hyperphenylalaninemia may show similar symptoms of the disorder (high levels of phenylalanine in blood), but these indicators will usually disappear at the end of gestation. Pregnant women with PKU must control their blood phenylalanine levels even if the fetus is heterozygous for the defective gene because the fetus could be adversely affected due to hepatic immaturity.

A non-food source of phenylalanine is the artificial sweetener aspartame. This compound is metabolized by the body into several chemical byproducts including phenylalanine. The breakdown problems phenylketonurics have with the buildup of phenylalanine in the body also occurs with the ingestion of aspartame, although to a lesser degree. Accordingly, all products in Australia, the U.S. and Canada that contain aspartame must be labeled: "Phenylketonurics: Contains phenylalanine." In the UK, foods containing aspartame must carry ingredient panels that refer to the presence of "aspartame or E951" and they must be labeled with a warning "Contains a source of phenylalanine." In Brazil, the label "Contém Fenilalanina" (Portuguese for "Contains Phenylalanine") is mandatory in products which contain it. These warnings are placed to help individuals avoid such foods.

== D-, L- and DL-phenylalanine ==
The stereoisomer D-phenylalanine (DPA) can be produced by conventional organic synthesis, either as a single enantiomer or as a component of the racemic mixture. It does not participate in protein biosynthesis although it is found in proteins in small amounts—particularly aged proteins and food proteins that have been processed. The biological functions of D-amino acids remain unclear, although D-phenylalanine has pharmacological activity at niacin receptor 2.

DL-Phenylalanine (DLPA) is marketed as a nutritional supplement for its purported analgesic and antidepressant activities, which have been supported by clinical trials. DL-Phenylalanine is a mixture of D-phenylalanine and L-phenylalanine. The reputed analgesic activity of DL-phenylalanine may be explained by the possible blockage by D-phenylalanine of enkephalin degradation by the enzyme carboxypeptidase A. Enkephalins act as agonists of the mu and delta opioid receptors, and agonists of these receptors are known to produce antidepressant effects. The mechanism of DL-phenylalanine's supposed antidepressant activity may also be accounted for in part by the precursor role of L-phenylalanine in the synthesis of the neurotransmitters norepinephrine and dopamine, though clinical trials have not found an antidepressant effect from L-phenylalanine alone. Elevated brain levels of norepinephrine and dopamine are thought to have an antidepressant effect. D-Phenylalanine is absorbed from the small intestine and transported to the liver via the portal circulation. A small amount of D-phenylalanine appears to be converted to L-phenylalanine. D-Phenylalanine is distributed to the various tissues of the body via the systemic circulation. It appears to cross the blood–brain barrier less efficiently than L-phenylalanine, and so a small amount of an ingested dose of D-phenylalanine is excreted in the urine without penetrating the central nervous system.

L-Phenylalanine is an antagonist at α_{2}δ Ca^{2+} calcium channels with a K_{i} of 980 nM.

In the brain, L-phenylalanine is a competitive antagonist at the glycine binding site of NMDA receptor and at the glutamate binding site of AMPA receptor. At the glycine binding site of NMDA receptor L-phenylalanine has an apparent equilibrium dissociation constant (K_{B}) of 573 μM estimated by Schild regression which is considerably lower than brain L-phenylalanine concentration observed in untreated human phenylketonuria.L-Phenylalanine also inhibits neurotransmitter release at glutamatergic synapses in hippocampus and cortex with IC_{50} of 980 μM, a brain concentration seen in classical phenylketonuria, whereas D-phenylalanine has a significantly smaller effect.

== Commercial synthesis ==
L-Phenylalanine is produced for medical, feed, and nutritional applications, such as aspartame, in large quantities by utilizing the bacterium Escherichia coli, which naturally produces aromatic amino acids like phenylalanine. The quantity of L-phenylalanine produced commercially has been increased by genetically engineering E. coli, such as by altering the regulatory promoters or amplifying the number of genes controlling enzymes responsible for the synthesis of the amino acid.

== Derivatives ==
Borofalan (boronophenylalanine) is a dihydroxyboryl derivative of phenylalanine, used in neutron capture therapy.

4-Azido-L-phenylalanine is a protein-incorporated unnatural amino acid used as a tool for bioconjugation in the field of chemical biology.

== See also ==
- Phenylalaninol
