= MIT Nuclear Research Reactor =

Research nuclear reactor

MITR-II
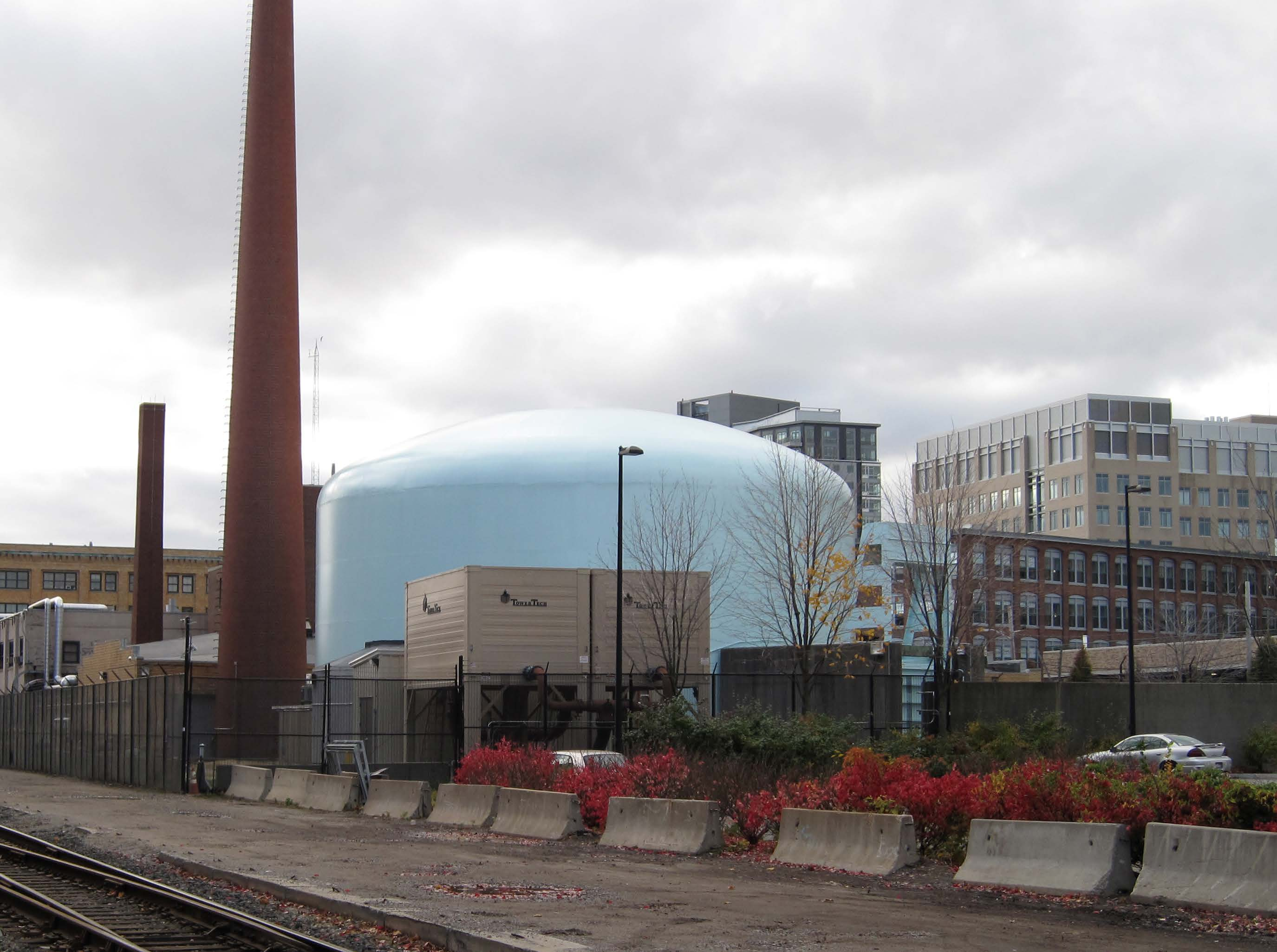
- MIT Nuclear Reactor Laboratory in Cambridge, Massachusetts, with Tower Tech cooling tower in the foreground

- Location within Massachusetts
- Operating institution: Massachusetts Institute of Technology
- Location: Cambridge, Massachusetts
- Coordinates: 42°21′37″N 71°05′47″W
- Type: tank
- Power: 6 MW (thermal)

Construction and upkeep
- Construction cost: US$3 million
- Construction began: 6 June 1956 (70 years ago)
- First criticality: 21 July 1958 (68 years ago)
- Annual upkeep cost: US$2.5 million
- Staff: 36
- Operators: 15
- Refuel frequency: 3-4 months

Technical specifications
- Max thermal flux: 6.0×10^{13} cm^{−2}s^{−1}
- Max fast flux: 1.2×10^{14} cm^{−2}s^{−1}
- Fuel type: plate type (27 (Three dedicated to in-core experiments)x)
- Cooling: light water
- Neutron moderator: light water
- Neutron reflector: heavy water; graphite
- Control rods: Six boron & stainless steel; One aluminum rod with cadmium wrap
- Cladding material: aluminum alloy

The MIT Nuclear Research Reactor (MITR) serves the research purposes of the Massachusetts Institute of Technology. It is a tank-type 6 megawatt reactor that is moderated and cooled by light water and uses heavy water as a reflector. It is the second largest university-based research reactor in the U.S. (after the University of Missouri Research Reactor Center) and has been in operation since 1958. It is the fourth-oldest operating reactor in the country.

== History ==
The first iteration of the reactor, MITR-I, operated from 1958 to 1974. The reactor was then upgraded to a new design, MITR-II, which offers a higher neutron flux.

There are plans to convert the reactor to use low-enriched uranium instead of high-enriched uranium to mitigate the proliferation risk; as of 2016, this conversion was planned for 2027.

== Technical specifications ==
The MITR-II design uses finned plate-type fuel arranged in a hexagonal pattern of rhomboid fuel assemblies. Power is controlled by six manual boron-stainless steel blade-type control rods and one aluminum with cadmium control rod which can be placed on automatic control. Light water flows upwards through the core and a tank of heavy water surrounds the core. A wall of dense concrete that serves as shielding surrounds the tank of heavy water. The maximum coolant temperature is 50 °C (122 °F). The light water and heavy water are cooled using forced circulation through heat exchangers to a secondary coolant system. The heat from the reactor is ultimately dissipated to the atmosphere via the secondary cooling system using two modular Tower Tech cooling towers – model TTXL-081950.

The reactor uses highly enriched uranium 235 fuel, in the form of uranium-aluminum cermet with aluminum cladding.

Refueling takes place 3 to 4 times every year. A single refueling involves rearranging the assemblies in the core or a combination of rearranging and replacement of old assemblies with new ones. This is more frequent than nuclear power plants and most research reactors. Power plants typically go 17 to 23 months between refueling outages, at which time they rearrange the entire core and replace 1/3 to 1/2 of the core. Many research reactors (particularly university reactors) go decades without refueling due to the high energy density of nuclear fuel and infrequent use at high power levels.

== Uses ==
The MITR research program encompasses most aspects of neutron science and engineering including nuclear medicine. Some of these activities are:

- Neutron activation analysis for the identification of trace elements and isotope ratios in geological specimens
- Fission engineering
- Materials testing
- Training
- Neutron transmutation doping of silicon
- Nuclear medicine production from irradiated gold
- Arsenic dose measuring using a sample from hairs
- Experiments related to molten salt for use as reactor coolant

The MITR is one of only six facilities in the world that was engaged in patient trials for the use of boron neutron capture therapy (BNCT) to treat both brain tumors and skin cancer. The MITR fission converter beam is the first to be designed for BNCT. The facility no longer conducts BNCT trials.

The reactor has been criticized by Miles Pomper of the James Martin Center for Nonproliferation Studies for having insufficiently unique uses relative to the risk of using highly enriched uranium.

== Gallery ==
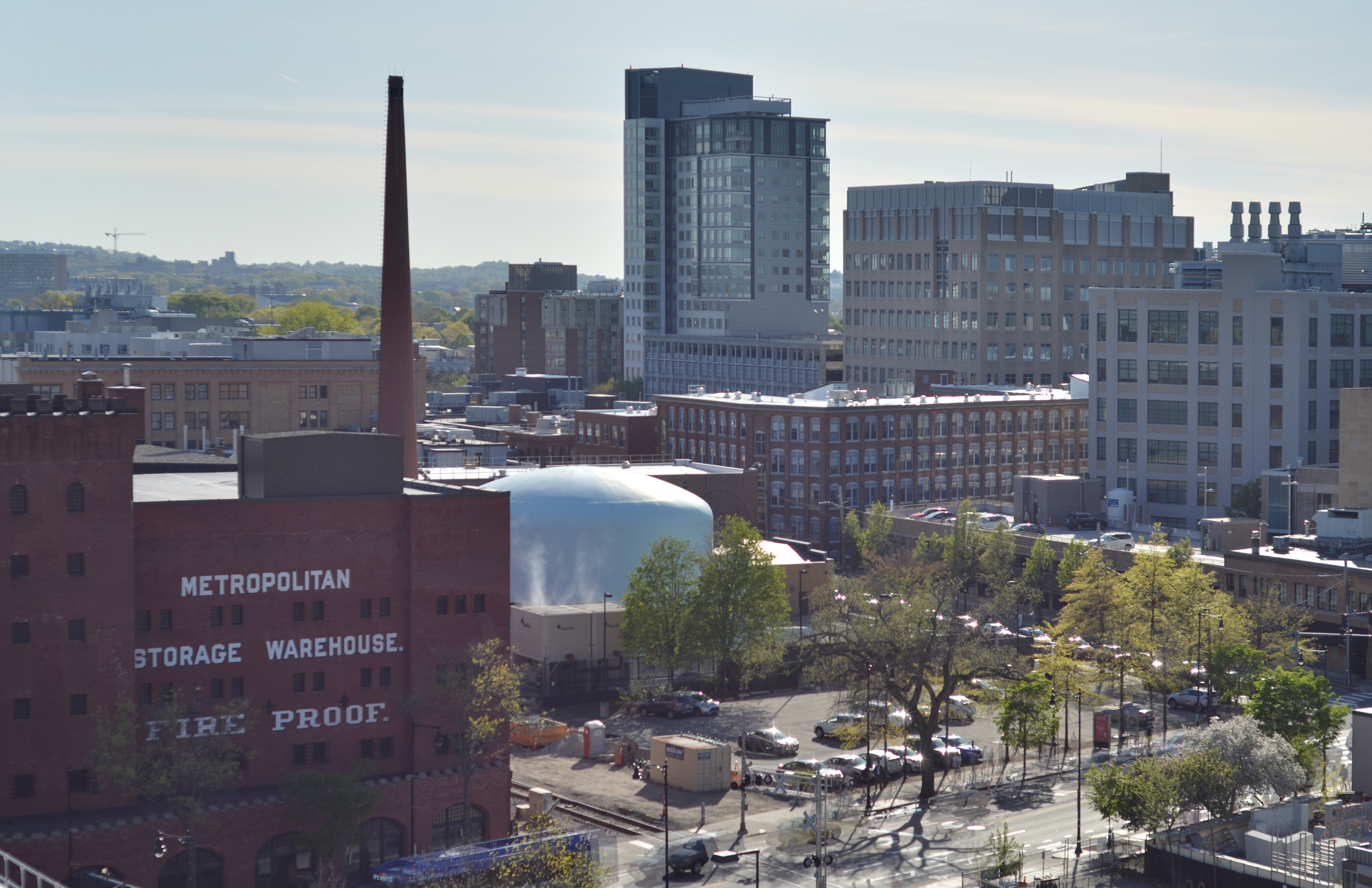
MITR, along with the Metropolitan Storage Warehouse, viewed from MIT Building 37.

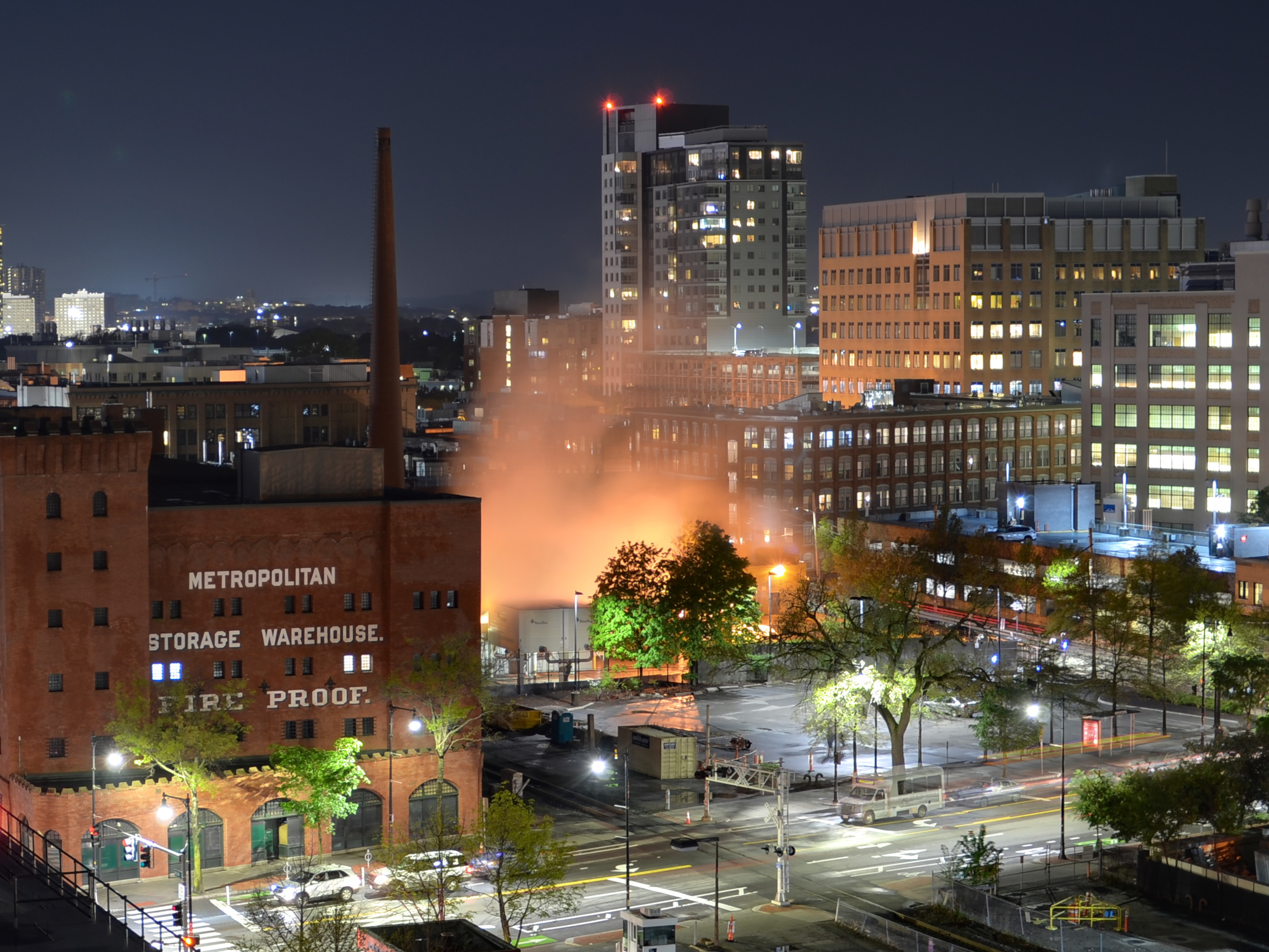
Night time view from the same location. Fog produced by the cooling towers is brightly illuminated by floodlights.

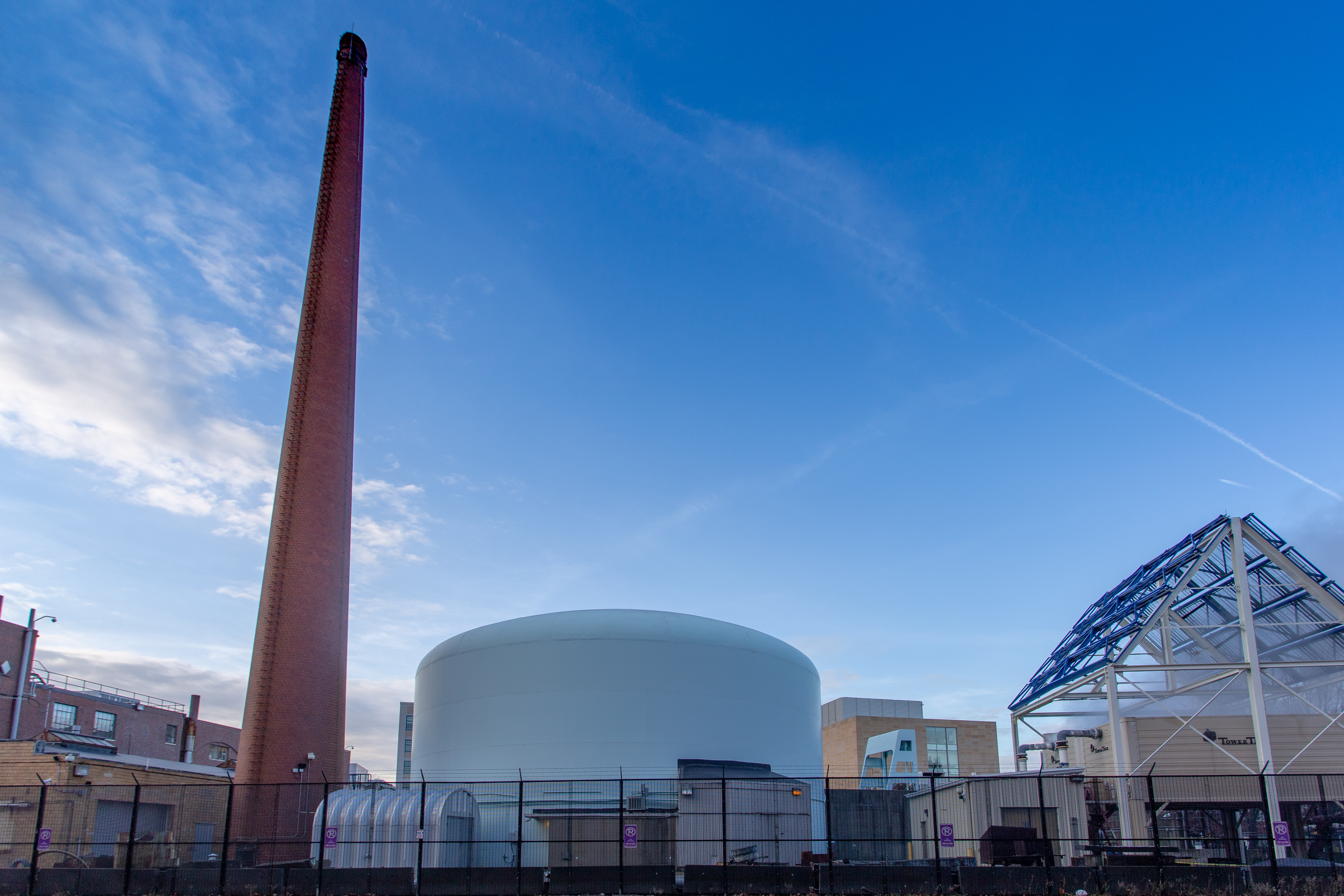
Close up view of the reactor.
