= Borofalan =

- Borofalan ^{10}B

Clinical data
- Trade names: Steboronine
- Other names: Borofalan(^{10}B); Borofalan B-10; Boronophenylalanine; L-4-Boronophenylalanine; ^{10}B-L-BPA

Identifiers
- IUPAC name: (2S)-2-Amino-3-(4-boronophenyl)propanoic acid
- CAS Number: 76410-58-7; ^{10}B: 80994-59-8
- PubChem CID: 150315; ^{10}B: 25033700
- ChemSpider: 132497; ^{10}B: 32698728
- UNII: JSM63LV5MD; ^{10}B: 963AI80S1B
- KEGG: ^{10}B: D11272
- ChEBI: CHEBI:232826
- ChEMBL: ChEMBL125582; ^{10}B: ChEMBL5220660
- PDB ligand: ^{10}B: 7N8 (PDBe, RCSB PDB)
- CompTox Dashboard (EPA): DTXSID30230833
- ECHA InfoCard: 100.215.136

Chemical and physical data
- Formula: C_{9}H_{12}B_{2}NO_{4}
- Molar mass: 219.82 g·mol^{−1}
- 3D model (JSmol): Interactive image; ^{10}B: Interactive image
- SMILES: B(C1=CC=C(C=C1)C[C@@H](C(=O)O)N)(O)O; ^{10}B: [10B](C1=CC=C(C=C1)C[C@@H](C(=O)O)N)(O)O
- InChI: InChI=1S/C9H12BNO4/c11-8(9(12)13)5-6-1-3-7(4-2-6)10(14)15/h1-4,8,14-15H,5,11H2,(H,12,13)/t8-/m0/s1; Key:NFIVJOSXJDORSP-QMMMGPOBSA-N; ^{10}B: InChI=1S/C9H12BNO4/c11-8(9(12)13)5-6-1-3-7(4-2-6)10(14)15/h1-4,8,14-15H,5,11H2,(H,12,13)/t8-/m0/s1/i10-1; Key:NFIVJOSXJDORSP-ULMHTEDTSA-N

Borofalan (also known as borofalan(^{10}B)) is a boron-containing pharmaceutical compound used as a boron carrier in boron neutron capture therapy (BNCT) for the treatment of cancer. It is a boronic acid derivative of phenylalanine enriched with the isotope boron-10. Borofalan has been approved in Japan for the treatment of unresectable, locally advanced, or locally recurrent head and neck cancer.

== Medical uses ==
Borofalan is used in BNCT for patients with recurrent or locally advanced head and neck cancer, including squamous-cell carcinoma and non-squamous-cell carcinoma. It is administered as an intravenous infusion over 2 hours, followed by neutron irradiation. In the open-label phase II clinical trial JHN002, borofalan was evaluated in combination with a cyclotron-based epithermal neutron source for recurrent or locally advanced head and neck cancer. Post-marketing surveillance in Japan conducted nationwide after approval confirmed the safety and efficacy of BNCT with borofalan in patients with locally advanced or recurrent head and neck cancer in a real-world setting.

== Mechanism of action ==
Due to its structural similarity to phenylalanine, it is preferentially taken up by cancer cells via amino acid transporters. Borofalan then acts as a radiation sensitizer by delivering boron-10 to tumor cells, where it captures thermal neutrons during BNCT, leading to the production of high-energy alpha particles and lithium-7 nuclei that cause localized cell death.

== History ==
Borofalan was developed by Stella Pharma Corporation. It received manufacturing and marketing approval in Japan from the Pharmaceuticals and Medical Devices Agency (PMDA) in 2020 for use in BNCT for unresectable, locally advanced, or locally recurrent head and neck cancer. Borofalan is marketed under the brand name Steboronine.

Boronophenylalanine-fructose complex (BPA-F) is a derivative of borofalan in which a molecule of fructose is bound to the boronic acid. It is designed for improved water solubility and pharmacokinetics.
