= Neutron capture therapy of cancer =

Nonsurgical treatment for locally invasive malignant tumors

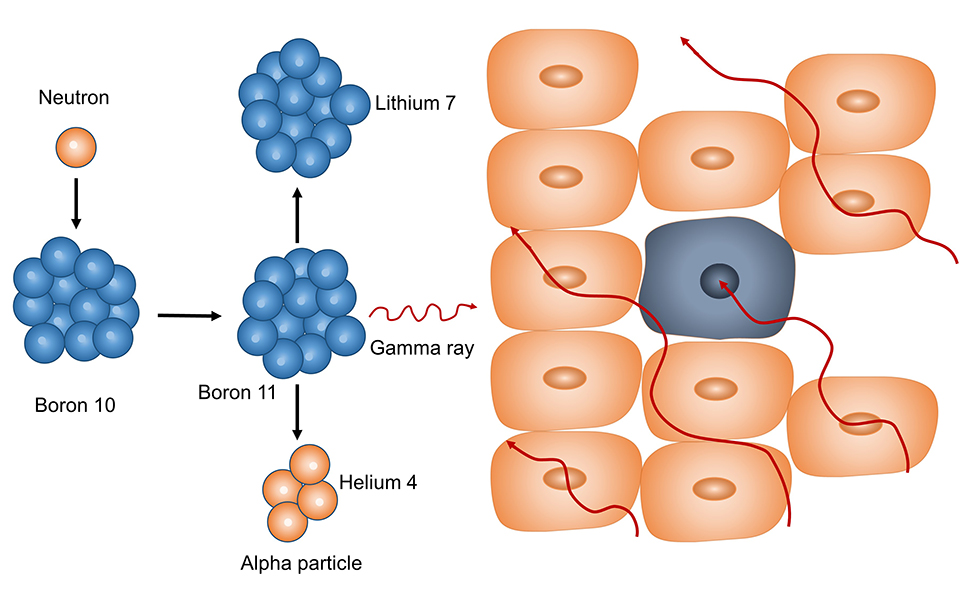
- a. BNCT is based on the neutron capture and decay reactions that occur when boron-10 is irradiated with low-energy (0.0025 eV) thermal neutrons. The resulting ^{10}B(n,α)^{7}Li capture reaction yields high linear energy transfer (LET) α particles (stripped down helium nuclei [^{4}He]) and recoiling lithium-7 (^{7}Li) atoms. b. The short range (5-9 μm) of the α particles limits the destructive effects to the boron-containing cells. In theory, BNCT can selectively destroy malignant cells while sparing adjacent normal tissue if the requisite amounts of ^{10}B and neutrons are delivered to the tumor cells. Reprinted from Barth RF, Mi P, Yang W (June 2018). "Boron delivery agents for neutron capture therapy of cancer". Cancer Communications. 38 (1): 35. doi:10.1186/s40880-018-0299-7 PMC 6006782. PMID 29914561).
- Specialty: Oncology

Neutron capture therapy (NCT) is a type of radiotherapy for treating locally invasive malignant tumors such as primary brain tumors, recurrent cancers of the head and neck region, and cutaneous and extracutaneous melanomas. It is a two-step process: first, the patient is injected with a tumor-localizing drug containing the stable isotope boron-10 (^{10}B), which has a high propensity to capture low-energy "thermal" neutrons. The neutron cross section of ^{10}B (3,837 barns) is 1,000 times more than that of other elements, such as nitrogen, hydrogen, or oxygen, that occur in tissue. In the second step, the patient is radiated with epithermal neutrons, the sources of which in the past have been nuclear reactors and now are accelerators that produce higher-energy epithermal neutrons. After losing energy as they penetrate tissue, the resultant low-energy thermal neutrons are captured by the ^{10}B atoms. The resulting decay reaction yields high-energy alpha particles that kill the cancer cells that have taken up enough ^{10}B.

All clinical experience with NCT to date is with boron-10; hence, this method is known as boron neutron capture therapy (BNCT). Use of another non-radioactive isotope, such as gadolinium, has been limited to experimental animal studies and has not been done clinically. BNCT has been evaluated as an alternative to conventional radiation therapy for malignant brain tumors such as glioblastomas, which presently are incurable, and more recently, locally advanced recurrent cancers of the head and neck region and, much less often, superficial melanomas mainly involving the skin and genital region.

== Boron neutron capture therapy ==
=== History ===
James Chadwick discovered the neutron in 1932. Shortly thereafter, H. J. Taylor reported that boron-10 nuclei had a high propensity to capture low-energy thermal neutrons. This reaction causes nuclear decay of the boron-10 nuclei into helium-4 nuclei (alpha particles) and lithium-7 ions. In 1936, G.L. Locher, a scientist at the Franklin Institute in Philadelphia, Pennsylvania, recognized the therapeutic potential of this discovery and suggested that this specific type of neutron capture reaction could be used to treat cancer.

William Sweet, a neurosurgeon at the Massachusetts General Hospital, first suggested the possibility of using BNCT to treat malignant brain tumors to evaluate BNCT for treatment of the most malignant of all brain tumors, glioblastoma multiforme (GBMs), using borax as the boron-delivery agent in 1951. A clinical trial subsequently was initiated by Lee Farr using a specially constructed nuclear reactor at the Brookhaven National Laboratory in Long Island, New York, USA. Another clinical trial was initiated in 1954 by Sweet at the Massachusetts General Hospital using the MIT Nuclear Research Reactor in Boston. Subsequent the clinical studies by Hiroshi Hatanaka (畠中洋), a former colleague of Sweet, in the 1960s in Japan sought to treat patients with brain tumors. No evidence of success was found in the any of these trials. The treatment approach was not tried in the US for 30 years following the disappointing results in 1961.

In 1995 Sweet was convicted of medical malpractice for the unexpected misery inflicted on the clinical study patients. His conviction was overturned posthumously on the grounds that he had compiled with medical guidelines current during the studies.

Part of the poor outcomes in the early studies was due to the very large doses of neutrons required in the treatments. Following some success from trials in Japan, trials with powerful but focused epithermal neutron beams began in the late 1990s in the US and Europe. Complexity and cost of the boron-based neutron technique lead to loss of funding by around 2000. Some studies using accelerator generated epithermal neutrons continue.

== Basic principles ==
Neutron capture therapy is a binary system that consists of two separate components to achieve its therapeutic effect. Each component in itself is non-tumoricidal, but when combined, they can be highly lethal to cancer cells.

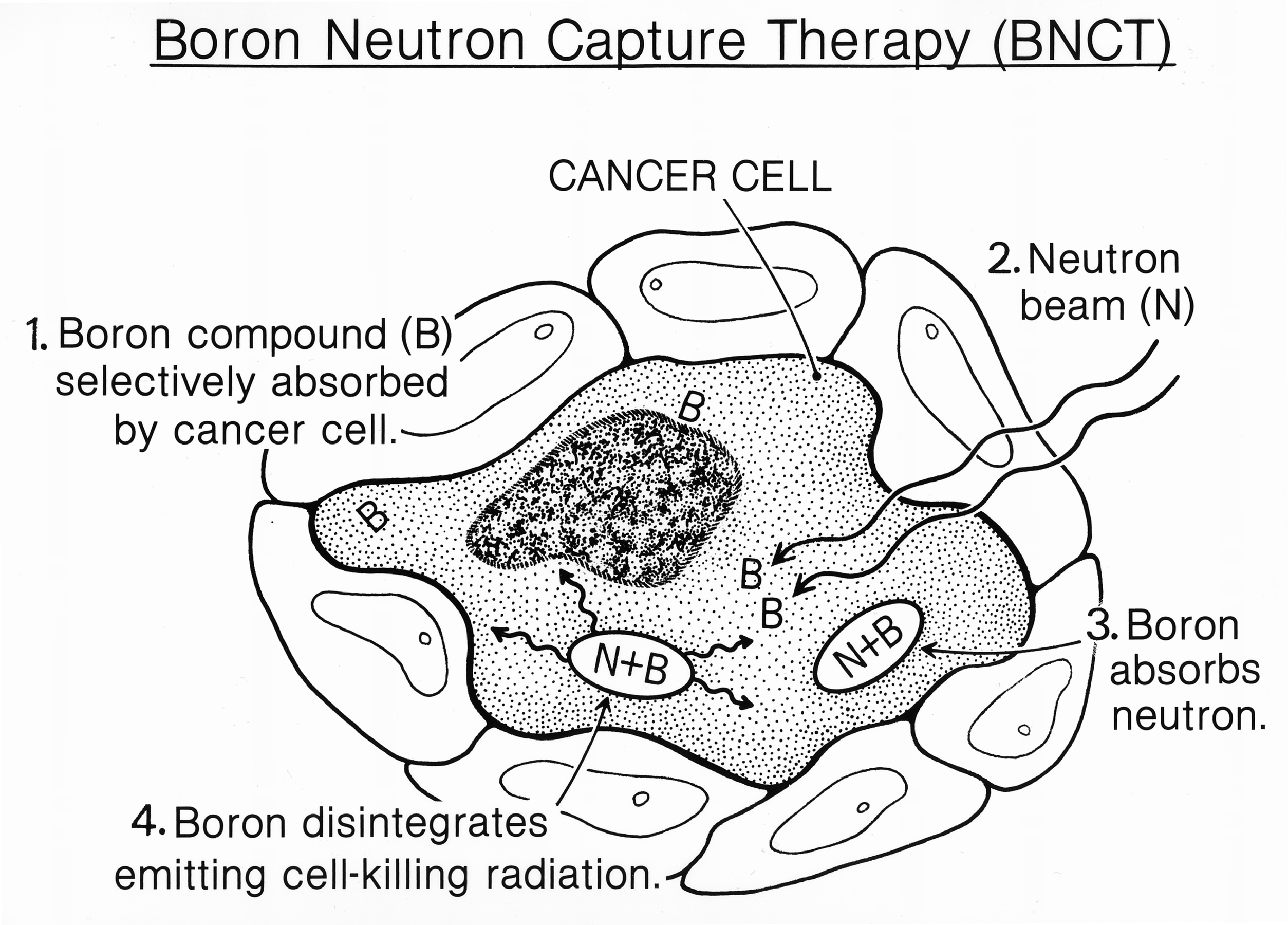
1) Boron compound (b) is selectively absorbed by cancer cell(s). 2) Neutron beam (n) is aimed at cancer site. 3) Boron absorbs neutron. 4) Boron disintegrates, emitting cancer-killing radiation.

BNCT is based on the nuclear capture and decay reactions that occur when non-radioactive boron-10, which makes up approximately 20% of natural elemental boron, is irradiated with neutrons of the appropriate energy to yield excited boron-11 (^{11}B*). This undergoes radioactive decay to produce high-energy alpha particles (^{4}He nuclei) and high-energy lithium-7 (^{7}Li) nuclei. The nuclear reaction is:

^{10}B + n_{th} → [^{11}B] *→ α + ^{7}Li + 2.31 MeV

Both the alpha particles and the lithium nuclei produce closely spaced ionizations in the immediate vicinity of the reaction, with a range of 5–9 μm. This approximately is the diameter of the target cell, and thus the lethality of the capture reaction is limited to boron-containing cells. BNCT, therefore, can be regarded as both a biologically and a physically targeted type of radiation therapy. The success of BNCT is dependent upon the selective delivery of sufficient amounts of ^{10}B to the tumor with only small amounts localized in the surrounding normal tissues. Thus, normal tissues, if they have not taken up sufficient amounts of boron-10, can be spared from the neutron capture and decay reactions. Normal tissue tolerance, however, is determined by the nuclear capture reactions that occur with normal tissue hydrogen and nitrogen.

A wide variety of boron delivery agents have been synthesized. The first, which has mainly been used in Japan, is a polyhedral borane anion, sodium borocaptate or BSH (Na_{2}B_{12}H_{11}SH), and the second is a dihydroxyboryl derivative of phenylalanine, called boronophenylalanine or BPA. The latter has been used in many clinical trials. Following administration of either BPA or BSH by intravenous infusion, the tumor site is irradiated with neutrons, the source of which, until recently, has been specially designed nuclear reactors and now is neutron accelerators. Until 1994, low-energy (< 0.5 eV) thermal neutron beams were used in Japan and the United States, but since they have a limited depth of penetration in tissues, higher-energy (0.5–10,000 eV) epithermal neutron beams, which have a greater depth of penetration, were used in clinical trials in the United States, Europe, Japan, Argentina, Taiwan, and China until recently, when accelerators replaced the reactors. In theory BNCT is a highly selective type of radiation therapy that can target tumor cells without causing radiation damage to the adjacent normal cells and tissues. Doses up to 60–70 grays (Gy) can be delivered to the tumor cells in one or two applications compared to 6–7 weeks for conventional fractionated external beam photon irradiation. However, the effectiveness of BNCT is dependent upon a relatively homogeneous cellular distribution of ^{10}B within the tumor, and more specifically within the constituent tumor cells, and this is still one of the main unsolved problems that have limited its success.

== Radiobiological considerations ==
The radiation doses to tumor and normal tissues in BNCT are due to energy deposition from three types of directly ionizing radiation that differ in their linear energy transfer (LET), which is the rate of energy loss along the path of an ionizing particle:

1. Low-LET gamma rays, resulting primarily from the capture of thermal neutrons by normal tissue hydrogen atoms [^{1}H(n,γ)^{2}H];
2. High-LET protons, produced by the scattering of fast neutrons and from the capture of thermal neutrons by nitrogen atoms [^{14}N(n,p)^{14}C]; and
3. High-LET, heavier charged alpha particles (stripped-down helium [^{4}He] nuclei) and lithium-7 ions, released as products of the thermal neutron capture and decay reactions with ^{10}B [^{10}B(n,α)^{7}Li].

Since both the tumor and surrounding normal tissues are present in the radiation field, even with an ideal epithermal neutron beam, there will be an unavoidable, non-specific background dose, consisting of both high- and low-LET radiation. However, a higher concentration of ^{10}B in the tumor will result in it getting a higher total dose than that of adjacent normal tissues, which is the basis for the therapeutic gain in BNCT. The total radiation dose in Gy delivered to any tissue can be expressed in photon-equivalent units as the sum of each of the high-LET dose components multiplied by weighting factors (Gy_{w}), which depend on the increased radiobiological effectiveness of each of these components.

== Clinical dosimetry ==
Biological weighting factors have been used in all of the more recent clinical trials in patients with high-grade gliomas, using boronophenylalanine (BPA) in combination with an epithermal neutron beam. The ^{10}B(n,α)^{7}Li part of the radiation dose to the scalp has been based on the measured boron concentration in the blood at the time of BNCT, assuming a blood:scalp boron concentration ratio of 1.5:1 and a compound biological effectiveness (CBE) factor for BPA in skin of 2.5. A relative biological effectiveness (RBE) or CBE factor of 3.2 has been used in all tissues for the high-LET components of the beam, such as alpha particles. The RBE factor is used to compare the biologic effectiveness of different types of ionizing radiation. The high-LET components include protons resulting from the capture reaction with normal tissue nitrogen, and recoil protons resulting from the collision of fast neutrons with hydrogen. It must be emphasized that the tissue distribution of the boron delivery agent in humans should be similar to that in the experimental animal model in order to use the experimentally derived values for estimation of the radiation doses for clinical radiations. For more detailed information relating to computational dosimetry and treatment planning, interested readers are referred to a comprehensive review on this subject.

== Boron delivery agents ==
The development of boron delivery agents for BNCT began in the early 1960s and is an ongoing and difficult task. A number of boron-10-containing delivery agents have been synthesized for potential use in BNCT. The most important requirements for a successful boron delivery agent are:

- low systemic toxicity and normal tissue uptake with high tumor uptake and concomitantly high tumor:brain (T:Br) and tumor:blood (T:Bl) concentration ratios (> 3–4:1);
- tumor concentrations in the range of ~20–50 μg ^{10}B/g tumor;
- rapid clearance from blood and normal tissues and persistence in tumor during BNCT.

However, as of 2021 no single boron delivery agent fulfills all of these criteria. With the development of new chemical synthetic techniques and increased knowledge of the biological and biochemical requirements needed for an effective agent and their modes of delivery, a wide variety of new boron agents has emerged (see examples in Table 1). However, only one of these compounds has ever been tested in large animals, and only boronophenylalanine (BPA) and sodium borocaptate (BSH) have been used clinically.

Table 1. Examples of new low- and high-molecular-weight boron delivery agents^{a,b}
Boric acid	Boronated unnatural amino acids
Boron nitride nanotubes	Boronated VEGF
Boron-containing immunoliposomes and liposomes	Carboranyl nucleosides
Boron-containing lipiodol	Carboranyl porphyrazines
Boron-containing nanoparticles	Carboranyl thymidine analogues
Boronated co-polymers	Decaborone (GB10)
Boronated cyclic peptides	Dodecaborate cluster lipids and cholesterol derivatives
Boronated DNA^{c} intercalators	Dodecahydro-closo-dodecaborate clusters
Boronated EGF and anti-EGFR MoAbs	Linear and cyclic peptides
Boronated polyamines	Polyanionic polymers
Boronated porphyrins	Transferrin-polyethylene glycol liposomes
Boronated sugars	

^{a}The delivery agents are not listed in any order that indicates their potential usefulness for BNCT. None of these agents have been evaluated in any animals larger than mice and rats, except for boronated porphyrin (BOPP) that also has been evaluated in dogs. However, due to the severe toxicity of BOPP in canines, no further studies were carried out.
^{b}See Barth, R.F., Mi, P., and Yang, W., Boron delivery agents for neutron capture therapy of cancer, Cancer Communications, 38:35 (doi:10.1186/s40880-018-0299-7 2018 for an updated review.
^{c}The abbreviations used in this table are defined as follows: BNCT, boron neutron capture therapy; DNA, deoxyribonucleic acid; EGF, epidermal growth factor; EGFR, epidermal growth factor receptor; MoAbs, monoclonal antibodies; VEGF, vascular endothelial growth factor.

The major challenge in the development of boron delivery agents has been the requirement for selective tumor targeting in order to achieve boron concentrations (20–50 μg/g tumor) sufficient to produce therapeutic doses of radiation at the site of the tumor with minimal radiation delivered to normal tissues. The selective destruction of infliltrative tumor (glioma) cells in the presence of normal brain cells represents an even greater challenge compared to malignancies at other sites in the body. Malignant gliomas are highly infiltrative of normal brain, histologically diverse, and heterogeneous in their genomic profile, and therefore it is very difficult to kill all of them.

== Gadolinium neutron capture therapy (Gd NCT) ==
There also has been some interest in the possible use of gadolinium-157 (^{157}Gd) as a capture agent for NCT for the following reasons: First, and foremost, has been its very high neutron-capture cross section of 254,000 barns. Second, gadolinium compounds, such as Gd-DTPA (gadopentetate dimeglumine Magnevist), have been used routinely as contrast agents for magnetic resonance imaging (MRI) of brain tumors and have shown high uptake by brain-tumor cells in tissue culture (in vitro). Third, gamma rays and internal conversion and Auger electrons are products of the ^{157}Gd(n,γ)^{158}Gd capture reaction (^{157}Gd + n_{th} (0.025eV) → [^{158}Gd] → ^{158}Gd + γ + 7.94 MeV). Though the gamma rays have longer pathlengths, orders of magnitude greater depths of penetration compared with alpha particles, the other radiation products (internal conversion and Auger electrons) have pathlengths of about one cell diameter and can directly damage DNA. Therefore, it would be highly advantageous for the production of DNA damage if the ^{157}Gd were localized within the cell nucleus. However, the possibility of incorporating gadolinium into biologically active molecules is very limited, and only a small number of potential delivery agents for Gd NCT have been evaluated. Relatively few studies with Gd have been carried out in experimental animals compared to the large number with boron-containing compounds (Table 1) which have been synthesized and evaluated in experimental animals (in vivo). Although in vitro activity has been demonstrated using the Gd-containing MRI contrast agent Magnevist as the Gd delivery agent, there are very few studies demonstrating the efficacy of Gd NCT in experimental animal tumor models, and, as evidenced by a lack of citations in the literature, Gd NCT has not, as of 2019, been used clinically in humans.

== Neutron sources ==
=== Clinical studies using nuclear reactors as neutron sources ===
Until 2014, neutron sources for NCT were limited to nuclear reactors. Reactor-derived neutrons are classified according to their energies as thermal (E_{n} < 0.5 eV), epithermal (0.5–10,000 eV), or fast (E_{n} >10 keV). Thermal neutrons are the most important for BNCT, since they usually initiate the ^{10}B(n,α)^{7}Li capture reaction. However, because they have a limited depth of penetration, epithermal neutrons, which lose energy and fall into the thermal range as they penetrate tissues, are now preferred for clinical therapy, other than for skin tumors such as melanoma.

A number of nuclear reactors with very good neutron-beam qualities have been developed and used clinically. These include:

1. Kyoto University Research Reactor Institute (KURRI) in Kumatori, Japan;
2. the Massachusetts Institute of Technology Research Reactor (MITR);
3. the FiR1 (Triga Mk II) research reactor at VTT Technical Research Centre, Espoo, Finland;
4. the RA-6 CNEA reactor in Bariloche, Argentina;
5. the High Flux Reactor (HFR) at Petten in the Netherlands;
6. Tsing Hua Open-pool Reactor (THOR) at the National Tsing Hua University, Hsinchu, Taiwan;
7. JRR-4 at Japan Atomic Energy Agency, Tokai, Japan;
8. A compact In-Hospital Neutron Irradiator (IHNI) in a free-standing facility in Beijing, China.

As of May 2021, only the reactors in Argentina, China, and Taiwan are still being used clinically. It is anticipated that, beginning some time in 2022, clinical studies in Finland will utilize an accelerator neutron source designed and fabricated in the United States by Neutron Therapeutics, Danvers, Massachusetts.

== Clinical studies of BNCT for brain tumors ==
=== Early studies in the US and Japan ===
It was not until the 1950s that the first clinical trials were initiated by Farr at the Brookhaven National Laboratory (BNL) in New York and by Sweet and Brownell at the Massachusetts General Hospital (MGH) using the Massachusetts Institute of Technology (MIT) nuclear reactor (MITR) and several different low-molecular-weight boron compounds as the boron delivery agent. However, the results of these studies were disappointing, and no further clinical trials were carried out in the United States until the 1990s.

Following a two-year Fulbright fellowship in Sweet's laboratory at the MGH, clinical studies were initiated by Hiroshi Hatanaka in Japan in 1967. He used a low-energy thermal neutron beam, which had low tissue-penetrating properties, and sodium borocaptate (BSH) as the boron delivery agent, which had been evaluated as a boron delivery agent by Albert Soloway at the MGH. In Hatanaka's procedure, as much as possible of the tumor was surgically resected ("debulking"), and at some time thereafter, BSH was administered by a slow infusion, usually intra-arterially, but later intravenously. Twelve to 14 hours later, BNCT was carried out at one or another of several different nuclear reactors using low-energy thermal neutron beams. The poor tissue-penetrating properties of the thermal neutron beams necessitated reflecting the skin and raising a bone flap in order to directly irradiate the exposed brain, a procedure first used by Sweet and his collaborators.

Approximately 200+ patients were treated by Hatanaka, and subsequently by his associate, Nakagawa. Due to the heterogeneity of the patient population, in terms of the microscopic diagnosis of the tumor and its grade, size, and the ability of the patients to carry out normal daily activities (Karnofsky performance status), it was not possible to come up with definitive conclusions about therapeutic efficacy. However, the survival data were no worse than those obtained by standard therapy at the time, and there were several patients who were long-term survivors, and most probably they were cured of their brain tumors.

=== Further clinical studies in the United States and Japan ===
==== US (2003) ====
BNCT of patients with brain tumors was resumed in the United States in the mid-1990s by Chanana, Diaz, and Coderre and their co-workers at the Brookhaven National Laboratory using the Brookhaven Medical Research Reactor (BMRR) and at Harvard/Massachusetts Institute of Technology (MIT) using the MIT Research Reactor (MITR).

For the first time, BPA was used as the boron delivery agent, and patients were irradiated with a collimated beam of higher-energy epithermal neutrons, which had greater tissue-penetrating properties than thermal neutrons. A research group headed up by Zamenhof at the Beth Israel Deaconess Medical Center/Harvard Medical School and MIT was the first to use an epithermal neutron beam for clinical trials.

Initially patients with cutaneous melanomas were treated, and this was expanded to include patients with brain tumors, specifically melanoma metastatic to the brain and primary glioblastomas (GBMs). Included in the research team were Otto Harling at MIT and the Radiation Oncologist Paul Busse at the Beth Israel Deaconess Medical Center in Boston. A total of 22 patients were treated by the Harvard-MIT research group. Five patients with cutaneous melanomas were also treated using an epithermal neutron beam at the MIT research reactor (MITR-II), and subsequently patients with brain tumors were treated using a redesigned beam at the MIT reactor that possessed far superior characteristics to the original MITR-II beam and BPA as the capture agent.

The clinical outcome of the cases treated at Harvard-MIT has been summarized by Busse. Although the treatment was well-tolerated, there were no significant differences in the mean survival times (MSTs) of patients that had received BNCT compared to those who received conventional external beam X-irradiation.

==== Japan (2009) - glioblastomas ====
Shin-ichi Miyatake and Shinji Kawabata at Osaka Medical College in Japan have carried out extensive clinical studies employing BPA (500 mg/kg) either alone or in combination with BSH (100 mg/kg), infused intravenously (i.v.) over 2 h, followed by neutron irradiation at Kyoto University Research Reactor Institute (KURRI) on patients with newly diagnosed and recurrent glioblastomas.

The mean survival time (MST) of 10 patients with recurrent high-grade gliomas in the first of their trials was 15.6 months, with one long-term survivor (>5 years).

Based on experimental animal data, which showed that BNCT in combination with X-irradiation produced enhanced survival compared to BNCT alone, in another study, Miyatake and Kawabata combined BNCT, as described above, with an X-ray boost. A total dose of 20 to 30 Gy was administered, divided into 2 Gy daily fractions. The MST of this group of patients (with newly diagnosed glioblastomas) was 23.5 months and no significant toxicity was observed, other than hair loss (alopecia). However, a significant subset of these patients, a high proportion of which had small-cell variant glioblastomas, developed cerebrospinal fluid dissemination of their tumors.

==== Japan (2011) - glioblastomas ====
In another Japanese trial with patients with newly diagnosed glioblastomas, carried out by Yamamoto et al., BPA and BSH were infused over 1 h, followed by BNCT at the Japan Research Reactor (JRR)-4 reactor. Patients subsequently received an X-ray boost after completion of BNCT. The overall median survival time (MeST) was 27.1 months, and the 1-year and 2-year survival rates were 87.5% and 62.5%, respectively.

Based on the reports of Miyatake, Kawabata, and Yamamoto, combining BNCT with an X-ray boost can produce a significant therapeutic gain. However, further studies are needed to optimize this combined therapy alone or in combination with other approaches including chemo- and immunotherapy, and to evaluate it using a larger patient population.

==== Japan (2021) - meningiomas ====
Miyatake and his co-workers also have treated a cohort of 44 patients with recurrent high-grade meningiomas (HGM) that were refractory to all other therapeutic approaches. The clinical regimen consisted of intravenous administration of boronophenylalanine two hours before neutron irradiation at the Kyoto University Research Reactor Institute in Kumatori, Japan. Effectiveness was determined using radiographic evidence of tumor shrinkage, overall survival (OS) after initial diagnosis, OS after BNCT, and radiographic patterns associated with treatment failure.

The median OS after BNCT was 29.6 months and 98.4 months after diagnosis. Better responses were seen in patients with lower-grade tumors. In 35 of 36 patients, there was tumor shrinkage, and the median progression-free survival (PFS) was 13.7 months. There was good local control of the patients' tumors, as evidenced by the fact that only 22.2% of them experienced local recurrence of their tumors. From these results, it was concluded that BNCT was effective in locally controlling tumor growth, shrinking tumors, and improving survival with acceptable safety in patients with therapeutically refractory HGMs.

Table 2. Past BNCT clinical trials using an epithermal neutron beams for BNCT of patients with gliomas*
Reactor facility*	No. of patients and duration of trial	Delivery agent	Median survival time (months)	Reference no.
BMRR, US	53 (1994–1999)	BPA 250–330 mg/kg	12.8	
MITR, MIT, US	20 (1996–1999)	BPA 250 or 350 mg/kg	11.1	
KURRI, Japan	40 (1998–2008)	BPA 500 mg/kg	23.5 (primary + X-ray)	
JRR4, Japan	15 (1998–2007)	BPA 250 mg/kg + BSH 5 g	10.8 (recurrent), 27.1 (+ X-ray)	
R2-0, Studsvik Medical AB, Sweden	30 (2001–2007)	BPA 900 mg/kg	17.7 (primary)	
FiR1, Finland	50 (1999–2012)	BPA 290–400 mg/kg	11.0 – 21.9 (primary), 7.0 (recurrent)	
HFR, Netherlands	26 (1997–2002)	BSH 100 mg/kg	10.4 – 13.2	
* A more comprehensive compilation of data relating to BNCT clinical trials can be found in Radiation Oncology 7:146–167, 2012

=== Clinical studies in Finland ===
The technological and physical aspects of the Finnish BNCT program have been described in considerable detail by Savolainen et al. A team of clinicians led by Heikki Joensuu and Leena Kankaanranta and nuclear engineers led by Iro Auterinen and Hanna Koivunoro at the Helsinki University Central Hospital and VTT Technical Research Center of Finland have treated approximately 200+ patients with recurrent malignant gliomas (glioblastomas) and head and neck cancer who had undergone standard therapy, recurred, and subsequently received BNCT at the time of their recurrence using BPA as the boron delivery agent. The median time to progression in patients with gliomas was 3 months, and the overall MeST was 7 months. It is difficult to compare these results with other reported results in patients with recurrent malignant gliomas, but they are a starting point for future studies using BNCT as salvage therapy in patients with recurrent tumors. Due to a variety of reasons, including financial, no further studies have been carried out at this facility, which has been decommissioned. However, a new facility for BNCT treatment has been installed using an accelerator designed and fabricated by Neutron Therapeutics. This accelerator was specifically designed to be used in a hospital, and the BNCT treatment and clinical studies will be carried out there after dosimetric studies have been completed in 2021. Both Finnish and foreign patients are expected to be treated at the facility.

=== Clinical studies in Sweden ===
To conclude this section on treating brain tumors with BNCT using reactor neutron sources, a clinical trial that was carried out by Stenstam, Sköld, Capala, and their co-workers in Studsvik, Sweden, using an epithermal neutron beam produced by the Studsvik nuclear reactor, which had greater tissue penetration properties than the thermal beams originally used in the United States and Japan, will be briefly summarized. This study differed significantly from all previous clinical trials in that the total amount of BPA administered was increased (900 mg/kg), and it was infused i.v. over 6 hours. This was based on experimental animal studies in glioma-bearing rats demonstrating enhanced uptake of BPA by infiltrating tumor cells following a 6-hour infusion. The longer infusion time of the BPA was well-tolerated by the 30 patients who were enrolled in this study. All were treated with 2 fields, and the average whole-brain dose was 3.2–6.1 Gy (weighted), and the minimum dose to the tumor ranged from 15.4 to 54.3 Gy (w). There has been some disagreement among the Swedish investigators regarding the evaluation of the results. Based on incomplete survival data, the MeST was reported as 14.2 months and the time to tumor progression was 5.8 months. However, more careful examination of the complete survival data revealed that the MeST was 17.7 months compared to 15.5 months that has been reported for patients who received standard therapy of surgery, followed by radiotherapy (RT) and the drug temozolomide (TMZ). Furthermore, the frequency of adverse events was lower after BNCT (14%) than after radiation therapy (RT) alone (21%), and both of these were lower than those seen following RT in combination with TMZ. If this improved survival data, obtained using the higher dose of BPA and a 6-hour infusion time, can be confirmed by others, preferably in a randomized clinical trial, it could represent a significant step forward in BNCT of brain tumors, especially if combined with a photon boost.

== Clinical studies of BNCT for extracranial tumors ==
=== Head and neck cancers ===
The single most important clinical advance over the past 15 years has been the application of BNCT to treat patients with recurrent tumors of the head and neck region who had failed all other therapy. These studies were first initiated by Kato et al. in Japan. and subsequently followed by several other Japanese groups and by Kankaanranta, Joensuu, Auterinen, Koivunoro, and their co-workers in Finland. All of these studies employed BPA as the boron delivery agent, usually alone but occasionally in combination with BSH. A very heterogeneous group of patients with a variety of histopathologic types of tumors have been treated, the largest number of which had recurrent squamous cell carcinomas. Kato et al. have reported on a series of 26 patients with far-advanced cancer for whom there were no further treatment options. Either BPA + BSH or BPA alone were administered by a 1- or 2-hour i.v. infusion, and this was followed by BNCT using an epithermal beam. In this series, there were complete regressions in 12 cases, 10 partial regressions, and progression in 3 cases. The MST was 13.6 months, and the 6-year survival was 24%. Significant treatment related complications ("adverse" events) included transient mucositis, alopecia, and, rarely, brain necrosis and osteomyelitis.

Kankaanranta et al. have reported their results in a prospective Phase I/II study of 30 patients with inoperable, locally recurrent squamous cell carcinomas of the head and neck region. Patients received either two or, in a few instances, one BNCT treatment using BPA (400 mg/kg), administered i.v. over 2 hours, followed by neutron irradiation. Of 29 evaluated patients, there were 13 complete and 9 partial remissions, with an overall response rate of 76%. The most common adverse event was oral mucositis, oral pain, and fatigue. Based on the clinical results, it was concluded that BNCT was effective for the treatment of inoperable, previously irradiated patients with head and neck cancer. Some responses were durable but progression was common, usually at the site of the previously recurrent tumor. As previously indicated in the section on neutron sources, all clinical studies have ended in Finland, for variety of reasons including economic difficulties of the two companies directly involved, VTT and Boneca. However, clinical studies using an accelerator neutron source designed and fabricated by Neutron Therapeutics and installed at the Helsinki University Hospital should be fully functional by 2022. Finally, a group in Taiwan, led by Ling-Wei Wang and his co-workers at the Taipei Veterans General Hospital, have treated 17 patients with locally recurrent head and neck cancers at the Tsing Hua Open-pool Reactor (THOR) of the National Tsing Hua University. Two-year overall survival was 47%, and two-year loco-regional control was 28%. Further studies are in progress to further optimize their treatment regimen.

=== Other types of tumor ===
==== Melanoma and extramammary Paget's disease ====
Other extracranial tumors that have been treated with BNCT include malignant melanomas. The original studies were carried out in Japan by the late Yutaka Mishima and his clinical team in the Department of Dermatology at Kobe University using locally injected BPA and a thermal neutron beam. It is important to point out that it was Mishima who first used BPA as a boron delivery agent, and this approach subsequently was extended to other types of tumors based on the experimental animal studies of Coderre et al. at the Brookhaven National Laboratory. Local control was achieved in almost all patients, and some were cured of their melanomas. Patients with melanoma of the head and neck region, vulva, and extramammary Paget's disease of the genital region have been treated by Hiratsuka et al. with promising clinical results. The first clinical trial of BNCT in Argentina for the treatment of melanomas was performed in October 2003, and since then several patients with cutaneous melanomas have been treated as part of a Phase II clinical trial at the RA-6 nuclear reactor in Bariloche. The neutron beam has a mixed thermal-hyperthermal neutron spectrum that can be used to treat superficial tumors. The In-Hospital Neutron Irradiator (IHNI) in Beijing has been used to treat a small number of patients with cutaneous melanomas with a complete response of the primary lesion and no evidence of late radiation injury during a 24+-month follow-up period.

==== Colorectal cancer ====
Two patients with colon cancer, which had spread to the liver, have been treated by Zonta and his co-workers at the University of Pavia in Italy. The first was treated in 2001 and the second in mid-2003. The patients received an i.v. infusion of BPA, followed by removal of the liver (hepatectomy), which was irradiated outside of the body (extracorporeal BNCT) and then re-transplanted into the patient. The first patient did remarkably well and survived for over 4 years after treatment, but the second died within a month of cardiac complications. Clearly, this is a very challenging approach for the treatment of hepatic metastases, and it is unlikely that it will ever be widely used. Nevertheless, the good clinical results in the first patient established proof of principle. Finally, Yanagie and his colleagues at Meiji Pharmaceutical University in Japan have treated several patients with recurrent rectal cancer using BNCT. Although no long-term results have been reported, there was evidence of short-term clinical responses.

== Accelerators as neutron sources ==
Accelerators now are the primary source of epithermal neutrons for clinical BNCT. The first papers relating to their possible use were published in the 1980s, and, as summarized by Blue and Yanch, this topic became an active area of research in the early 2000s. However, it was the Fukushima nuclear accident in Japan in 2011 that gave impetus to their development for clinical use. Accelerators also can be used to produce epithermal neutrons. Today several accelerator-based neutron sources (ABNS) are commercially available or under development. Most existing or planned systems use either the lithium-7 reaction, ^{7}Li(p,n)^{7}Be or the beryllium-9 reaction, ^{9}Be(p,n)^{9}B, to generate neutrons, though other nuclear reactions also have been considered. The lithium-7 reaction requires a proton accelerator with energies between 1.9 and 3.0 MeV, while the beryllium-9 reaction typically uses accelerators with energies between 5 and 30 MeV. Aside from the lower proton energy that the lithium-7 reaction requires, its main benefit is the lower energy of the neutrons produced. This in turn allows the use of smaller moderators, "cleaner" neutron beams, and reduced neutron activation. Benefits of the beryllium-9 reaction include simplified target design and disposal, long target lifetime, and lower required proton beam current.

Since the proton beams for BNCT are quite powerful (~20-100 kW), the neutron generating target must incorporate cooling systems capable of removing the heat safely and reliably to protect the target from damage. In the case of the lithium-7, this requirement is especially important due to the low melting point and chemical volatility of the target material. Liquid jets, micro-channels and rotating targets have been employed to solve this problem. Several researchers have proposed the use of liquid lithium-7 targets in which the target material doubles as the coolant. In the case of beryllium-9, "thin" targets, in which the protons come to rest and deposit much of their energy in the cooling fluid, can be employed. Target degradation due to beam exposure ("blistering") is another problem to be solved, either by using layers of materials resistant to blistering or by spreading the protons over a large target area. Since the nuclear reactions yield neutrons with energies ranging from < 100keV to tens of MeV, a beam-shaping assembly (BSA) must be used to moderate, filter, reflect, and collimate the neutron beam to achieve the desired epithermal energy range, neutron beam size, and direction. BSAs are typically composed of a range of materials with desirable nuclear properties for each function. A well-designed BSA should maximize neutron yield per proton while minimizing fast neutron, thermal neutron, and gamma contamination. It should also produce a sharply delimited and generally forward-directed beam, enabling flexible positioning of the patient relative to the aperture. One key challenge for an ABNS is the duration of treatment time: depending on the neutron beam intensity, treatments can take up to an hour or more. Therefore, it is desirable to reduce the treatment time both for patient comfort during immobilization and to increase the number of patients that could be treated in a 24-hour period. Increasing the neutron beam intensity for the same proton current by adjusting the BSA is often achieved at the cost of reduced beam quality (higher levels of unwanted fast neutrons or gamma rays in the beam or poor beam collimation). Therefore, increasing the proton current delivered by ABNS BNCT systems remains a key goal of technology development programs.

The table below summarizes the existing or planned ABNS installations for clinical use (updated November, 2024).

Manufacturer Product Reaction Accelerator type	Host institution	First clinical use	Status
Sumitomo Heavy Industries NeuCure^{9}Be(p,n)^{9}B Cyclotron	Particle Radiation Oncology Research Center, Kyoto University, Kumatori, Japan	2012	Retired from clinical use
Sumitomo Heavy Industries NeuCure^{9}Be(p,n)^{9}B Cyclotron	Southern Tohoku BCNT Research Center, Southern Tohoku General Hospital, Koriyama, Fukushima, Japan	2016	Active clinical use (approved)
Sumitomo Heavy Industries NeuCure^{9}Be(p,n)^{9}B Cyclotron	Kansai BNCT Research Center, Osaka Medical and Pharmaceutical University, Takatsuki, Osaka, Japan	2020	Active clinical use (approved)
Sumitomo Heavy Industries NeuCure^{9}Be(p,n)^{9}B Cyclotron	Pengbo Co., Ltd. in the Hainan Medical Tourism Pilot Zone	N/A	Under construction
Cancer Intelligence Care Systems^{7}Li(p,n)^{7}Be RFQ	National Cancer Center, Tsukiji, Tokyo, Japan	2019	Active clinical use (clinical trial)
Cancer Intelligence Care Systems^{7}Li(p,n)^{7}Be RFQ	Edogawa Hospital, Edogawa, Tokyo, Japan	2023	Active clinical use (clinical trial)
Neuboron Medical Group NeuPex^{7}Li(p,n)^{7}Be Tandem Electrostatic	Xiamen Humanity Hospital, Xiamen, China	2022	Active clinical use (clinical trial)
Dawon Medax^{9}Be(p,n)^{9}B LINAC	BNCT Clinic in the BRC Center, Songdo, Incheon, South Korea	2022	Active clinical use (clinical trial)
University of Tsukuba iBNCT^{9}Be(p,n)^{9}B LINAC	University of Tsukuba, Tokai, Ibaraki, Japan	2024	Active clinical use (clinical trial)
Neutron Therapeutics nuBeam^{7}Li(p,n)^{7}Be Single-ended electrostatic	Helsinki University Hospital, Helsinki, Finland	N/A	Operational
Neutron Therapeutics nuBeam^{7}Li(p,n)^{7}Be Single-ended electrostatic	Shonan Kamakura General Hospital, Kamakura, Kanagawa, Japan	N/A	Operational
CASBNCT D-BNCT^{7}Li(p,n)^{7}Be LINAC	Dongguan Peoples Hospital, Dongguan, Guangdong, China	N/A	Operational
Lanzhou University^{7}Li(p,n)^{7}Be LINAC	Fujian Medical University Union Hospital (Mazu Branch), Putian City, Fujian, China	N/A	Operational
TAE Life Sciences Alphabeam^{7}Li(p,n)^{7}Be Tandem Electrostatic	CNAO (National Center of Oncological Hadrontherapy), Pavia, Italy	N/A	Under construction

== Clinical studies using accelerator neutron sources ==
=== Treatment of recurrent malignant gliomas ===
The single greatest advance in moving BNCT forward clinically has been the introduction of cyclotron-based neutron sources (c-BNS) in Japan. Shin-ichi Miyatake and Shinji Kawabata have led the way with the treatment of patients with recurrent glioblastomas (GBMs). In their Phase II clinical trial, they used the Sumitomo Heavy Industries accelerator at the Osaka Medical College, Kansai BNCT Medical Center to treat a total of 24 patients. These patients ranged in age from 20 to 75 years, and all previously had received standard treatment consisting of surgery followed by chemotherapy with temozolomide (TMZ) and conventional radiation therapy. They were candidates for treatment with BNCT because their tumors had recurred and were progressing in size. They received an intravenous infusion of a proprietary formulation of ^{10}B-enriched boronophenylalanine ("Borofalan," StellaPharma Corporation, Osaka, Japan) prior to neutron irradiation. The primary endpoint of this study was the 1-year survival rate after BNCT, which was 79.2%, and the median overall survival rate was 18.9 months. Based on these results, it was concluded that c-BNS BNCT was safe and resulted in increased survival of patients with recurrent gliomas. Although there was an increased risk of brain edema due to re-irradiation, this was easily controlled. As a result of this trial, the Sumitomo accelerator was approved by the Japanese regulatory authority having jurisdiction over medical devices, and further studies are being carried out with patients who have recurrent, high-grade (malignant) meningiomas. However, further studies for the treatment of patients with GBMs have been put on hold pending additional analysis of the results.

=== Treatment of recurrent or locally advanced cancers of the head and neck ===
Katsumi Hirose and his co-workers at the Southern Tohoku BNCT Research Center in Koriyama, Japan, have reported on their results after treating 21 patients with recurrent tumors of the head and neck region. All of these patients had received surgery, chemotherapy, and conventional radiation therapy. Eight of them had recurrent squamous cell carcinomas (R-SCC), and 13 had either recurrent (R) or locally advanced (LA) non-squamous-cell carcinomas (nSCC). The overall response rate was 71%, and the complete response and partial response rates were 50% and 25%, respectively, for patients with R-SCC and 80% and 62%, respectively, for those with R or LA SCC. The overall 2-year survival rates for patients with R-SCC or R/LA nSCC were 58% and 100%, respectively. The treatment was well tolerated, and adverse events were those usually associated with conventional radiation treatment of these tumors. These patients had received a proprietary formulation of ^{10}B-enriched boronophenylalanine (Borofalan), which was administered intravenously. Although the manufacturer of the accelerator was not identified, it presumably was the one manufactured by Sumitomo Heavy Industries, Ltd., which was indicated in the Acknowledgements of their report. Based on this Phase II clinical trial, the authors suggested that BNCT using Borofalan and c-BENS was a promising treatment for recurrent head and neck cancers, although further studies would be required to firmly establish this.

== The future ==
Clinical BNCT first was used to treat highly malignant brain tumors and subsequently for melanomas of the skin that were difficult to treat by surgery. Later, it was used as a type of "salvage" therapy for patients with recurrent tumors of the head and neck region. The clinical results were sufficiently promising to lead to the development of accelerator neutron sources, which will be used almost exclusively in the future. Challenges for the future clinical success of BNCT that need to be met include the following:

1. Optimizing the dosing and delivery paradigms and administration of BPA and BSH.
2. The development of more tumor-selective boron delivery agents for BNCT and their evaluation in large animals and ultimately in humans.
3. Accurate, real-time dosimetry to better estimate the radiation doses delivered to the tumor and normal tissues in patients with brain tumors and head and neck cancer.
4. Further clinical evaluation of accelerator-based neutron sources for the treatment of brain tumors, head and neck cancer, and other malignancies.
5. Reducing the cost.

== See also ==
- Particle therapy, neutrons, protons, or heavy ions (e.g. carbon)
  - Fast neutron therapy
  - Proton therapy
