= Borax (disambiguation) =

Borax is Sodium borate, a boron-containing compound.

Borax may also refer to:

- Borax (mineral), the naturally occurring mineral
- Borax, Nevada, a ghost town in the United States
- Sodium perborate, another boron-containing mineral.
- BORAX experiments, a series of tests using the BORAX-I nuclear reactor
- Pacific Coast Borax Company, an American mining company
  - 20 Mule Team Borax, a brand of household cleaner originally manufactured by Pacific Coast Borax
- Borax, one of the dogs that tore apart Actaeon

== See also ==
- Borax Smith, Francis Marion Smith, an American business magnate
- 20 Mule Team Borax
- Borex, municipality in the canton of Vaud, Switzerland
