= Actaeon =

Greek mythical character

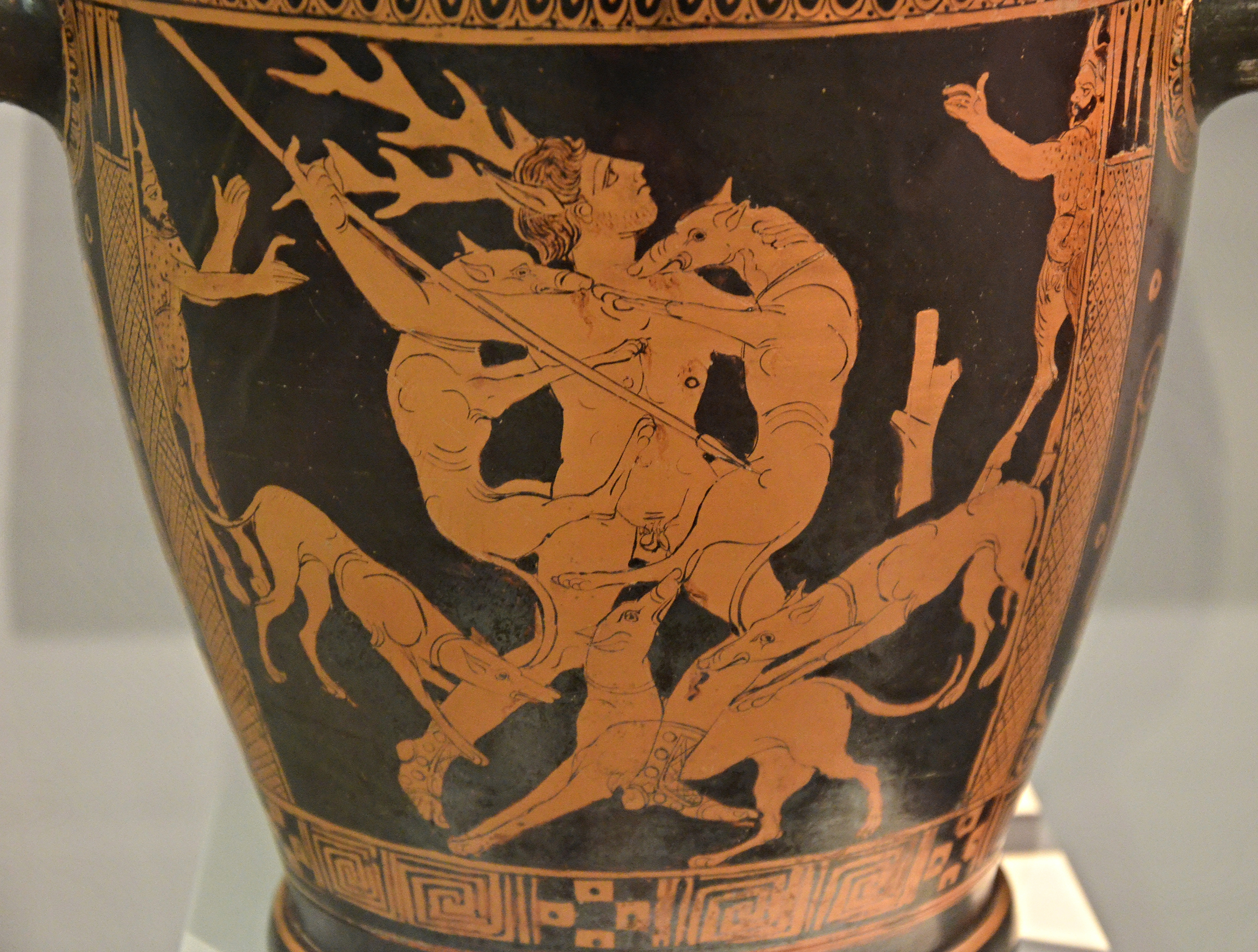
The death of Actaeon on red-figure skyphos from Paestum, 4th century BC (Karlsruhe, Badisches Landesmuseum).

In Greek mythology, Actaeon (/ækˈtiːən/; Ancient Greek: Ἀκταίων, romanized: Aktaiōn) was the son of the priestly herdsman Aristaeus in Boeotia, and a famous Theban hero. Through his mother Autonoë he was a member of the ruling House of Cadmus. Like Achilles in a later generation, he was trained by the centaur Chiron.

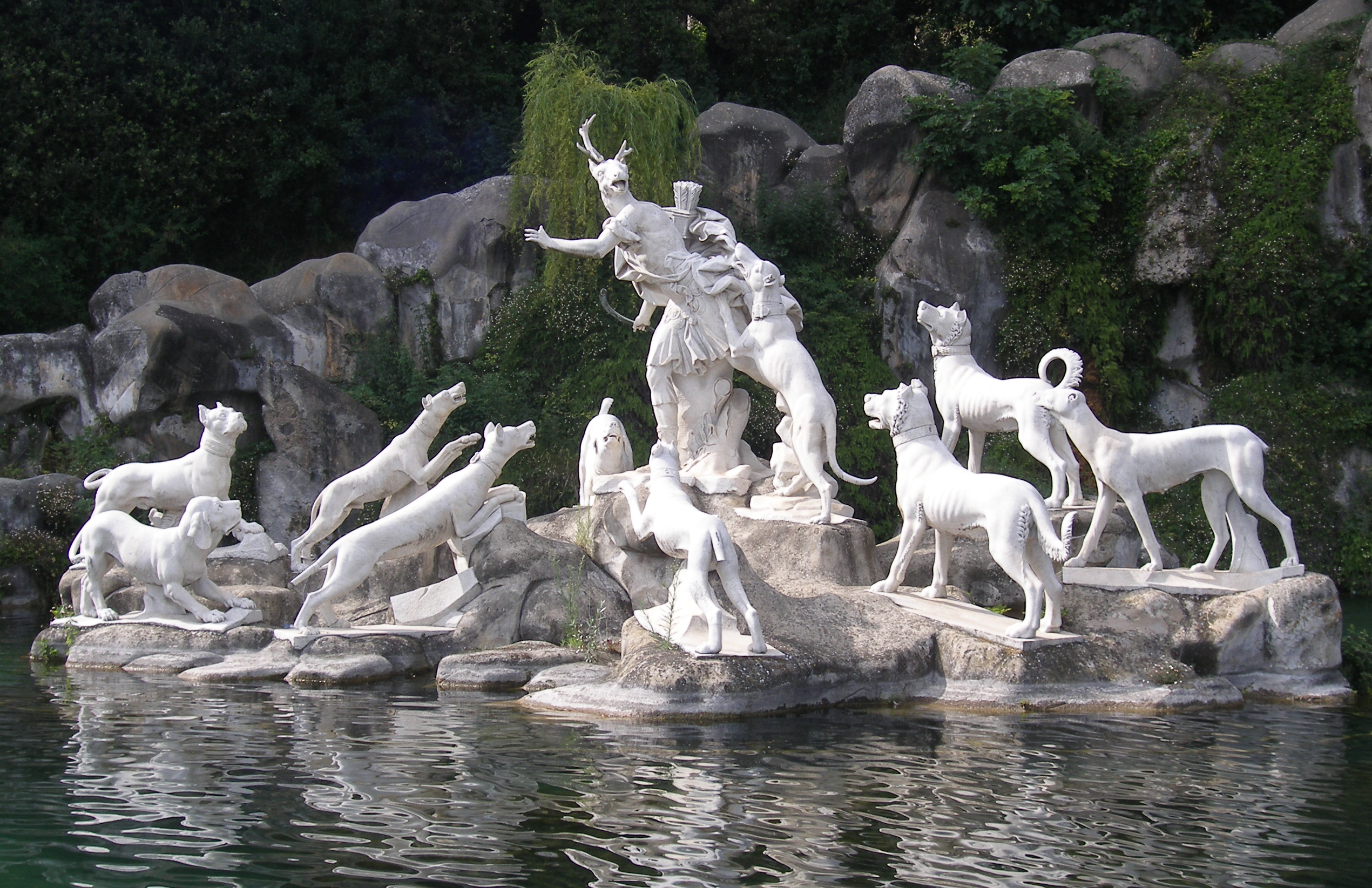
Actaeon, sculpture group in the cascade at Caserta

He succumbed to the fatal wrath of Artemis (later his myth became attached to tales of Artemis' Roman counterpart Diana), but the surviving details of his transgression vary: "the only certainty is in what Aktaion suffered, his pathos, and what Artemis did: the hunter became the hunted; he was transformed into a stag, and his raging hounds, struck with a 'wolf's frenzy' (Lyssa), tore him apart as they would a stag."

Most depictions, both in ancient art and in Renaissance and post-Renaissance art, show either the moment of transgression and transformation, or his killing by his own hounds.

== Story ==
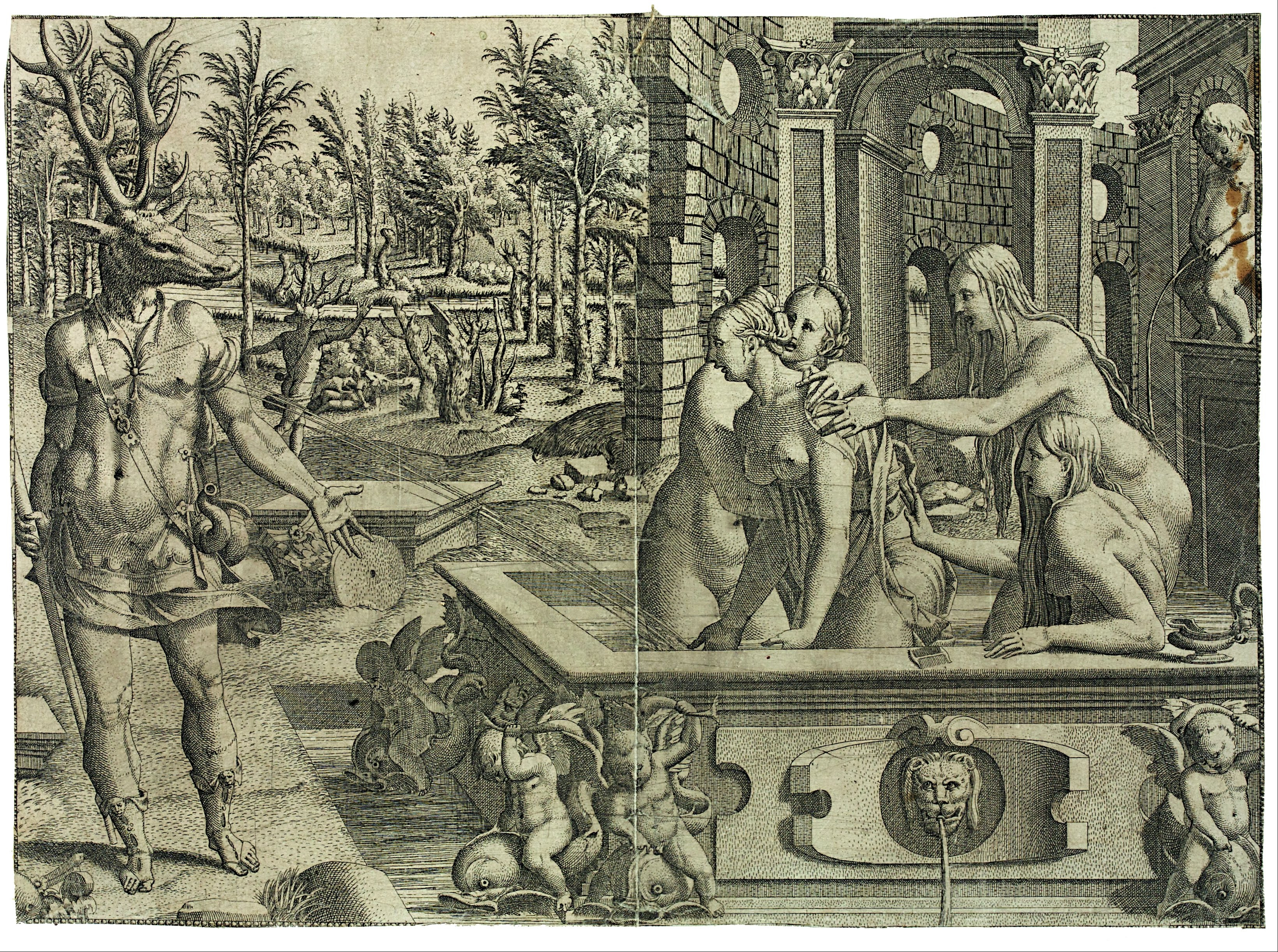
The Transformation of Actaeon, etching by Jean Mignon, 430 x 574 mm, 1550s?, without its very elaborate frame. Actaeon is shown three times, finally being killed by his hounds. with frame

Among others, John Heath has observed, "The unalterable kernel of the tale was a hunter's transformation into a deer and his death in the jaws of his hunting dogs. But authors were free to suggest different motives for his death." In the version that was offered by the Hellenistic poet Callimachus, which has become the standard setting, Artemis was bathing in the woods when the hunter Actaeon stumbled across her, thus seeing her naked. He stopped and stared, amazed at her ravishing beauty. Once seen, Artemis got revenge on Actaeon: she forbade him speech – if he tried to speak, he would be changed into a stag – for the unlucky profanation of her virginity's mystery.

Upon hearing the call of his hunting party, he cried out to them and immediately transformed. At this, he fled deep into the woods, and doing so he came upon a pond and, seeing his reflection, groaned. His own hounds then turned upon him and pursued him, not recognizing him. In an endeavour to save himself, he raised his eyes (and would have raised his arms, had he had them) toward Mount Olympus. The gods did not heed his desperation, and he was torn to pieces. An element of the earlier myth made Actaeon the familiar hunting companion of Artemis, no stranger. In an embroidered extension of the myth, the hounds were so upset with their master's death, that Chiron made a statue so lifelike that the hounds thought it was Actaeon.

There are various other versions of his transgression: The Hesiodic Catalogue of Women and the Bibliotheca of Apollodorus state that his offense was that he was a rival of Zeus for Semele, his mother's sister, whereas in Euripides' Bacchae he has boasted that he is a better hunter than Artemis:

ὁρᾷς τὸν Ἀκταίωνος ἄθλιον μόρον, ὃν ὠμόσιτοι σκύλακες ἃς ἐθρέψατο διεσπάσαντο, κρείσσον' ἐν κυναγίαις Ἀρτέμιδος εἶναι κομπάσαντ' ἐν ὀργάσιν.	Look at Actaeon's wretched fate who by the man-eating hounds he had raised, was torn apart, better at hunting than Artemis he had boasted to be, in the meadows.

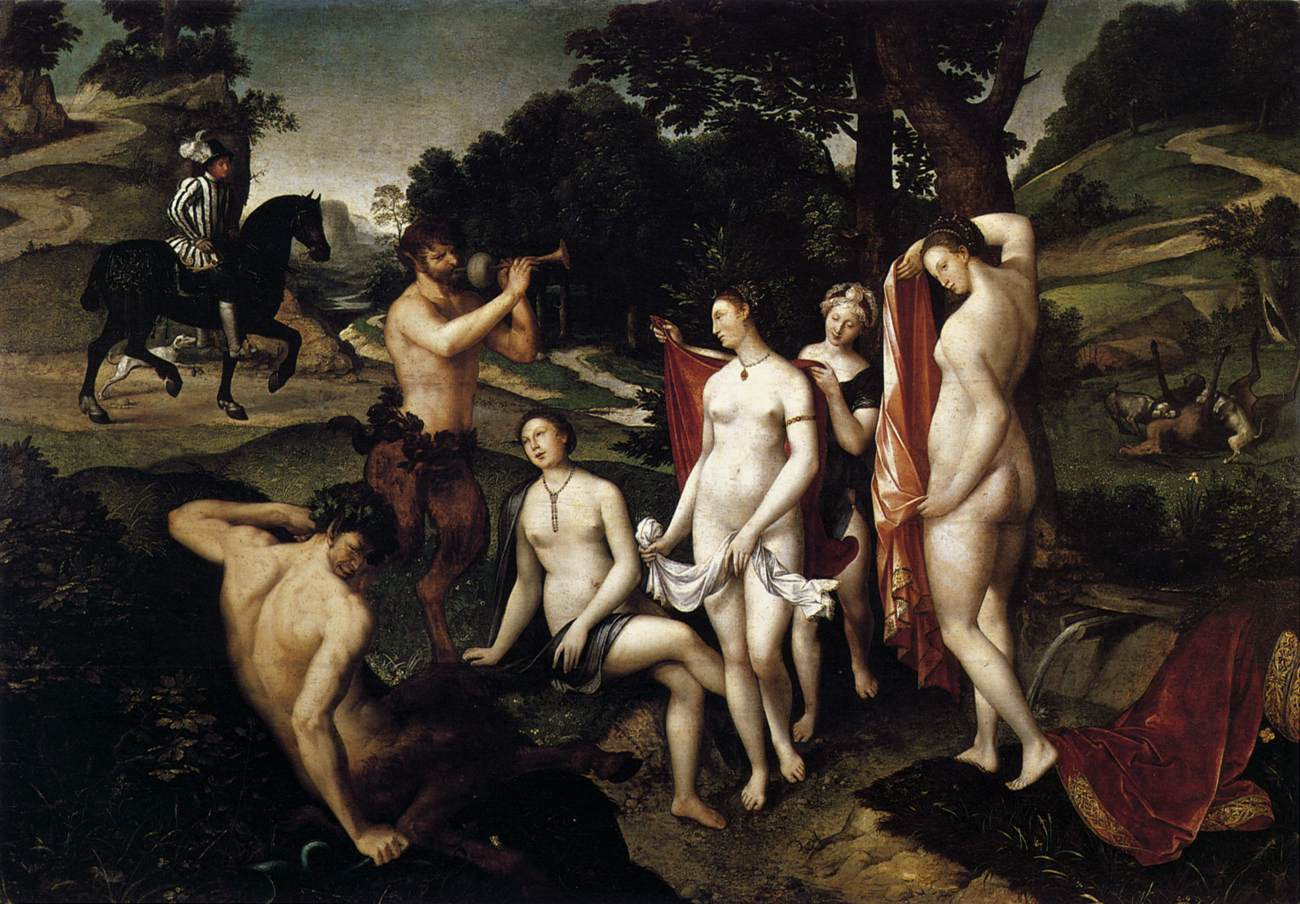
In François Clouet's Bath of Diana (1558–59) Actaeon's passing on horseback at left and mauling as a stag at right is incidental to the three female nudes.

Further sources, including the Hesiodic Catalogue of Women (from which only fragments survive) and at least four Attic tragedies, including a Toxotides of Aeschylus, have been lost. Diodorus Siculus (4.81.4), in a variant of Actaeon's hubris that has been largely ignored, has it that Actaeon wanted to marry Artemis. Other authors say the hounds were Artemis' own; some lost elaborations of the myth seem to have narrated their wanderings after his loss. A number of ancient Greek vases depicting the metamorphosis and death of Actaeon include the goddess Lyssa in the scene, infecting his dogs with rabies and setting them against him.

According to the Latin version of the story told by the Roman poet Ovid having accidentally seen Diana (Artemis) on Mount Cithaeron while she was bathing, he was changed by her into a stag, and pursued and killed by his fifty hounds. This version also appears in Callimachus' Fifth Hymn, as a mythical parallel to the blinding of Tiresias after he sees Athena bathing. The literary testimony of Actaeon's myth is largely lost, but Lamar Ronald Lacy, deconstructing the myth elements in what survives and supplementing it by iconographic evidence in late vase-painting, made a plausible reconstruction of an ancient Actaeon myth that Greek poets may have inherited and subjected to expansion and dismemberment. His reconstruction opposes a too-pat consensus that has an archaic Actaeon aspiring to Semele, a classical Actaeon boasting of his hunting prowess and a Hellenistic Actaeon glimpsing Artemis' bath. Lacy identifies the site of Actaeon's transgression as a spring sacred to Artemis at Plataea where Actaeon was a hero archegetes ("hero-founder") The righteous hunter, the companion of Artemis, seeing her bathing naked in the spring, was moved to try to make himself her consort, as Diodorus Siculus noted, and was punished, in part for transgressing the hunter's "ritually enforced deference to Artemis".

== The "bed of Actaeon" ==
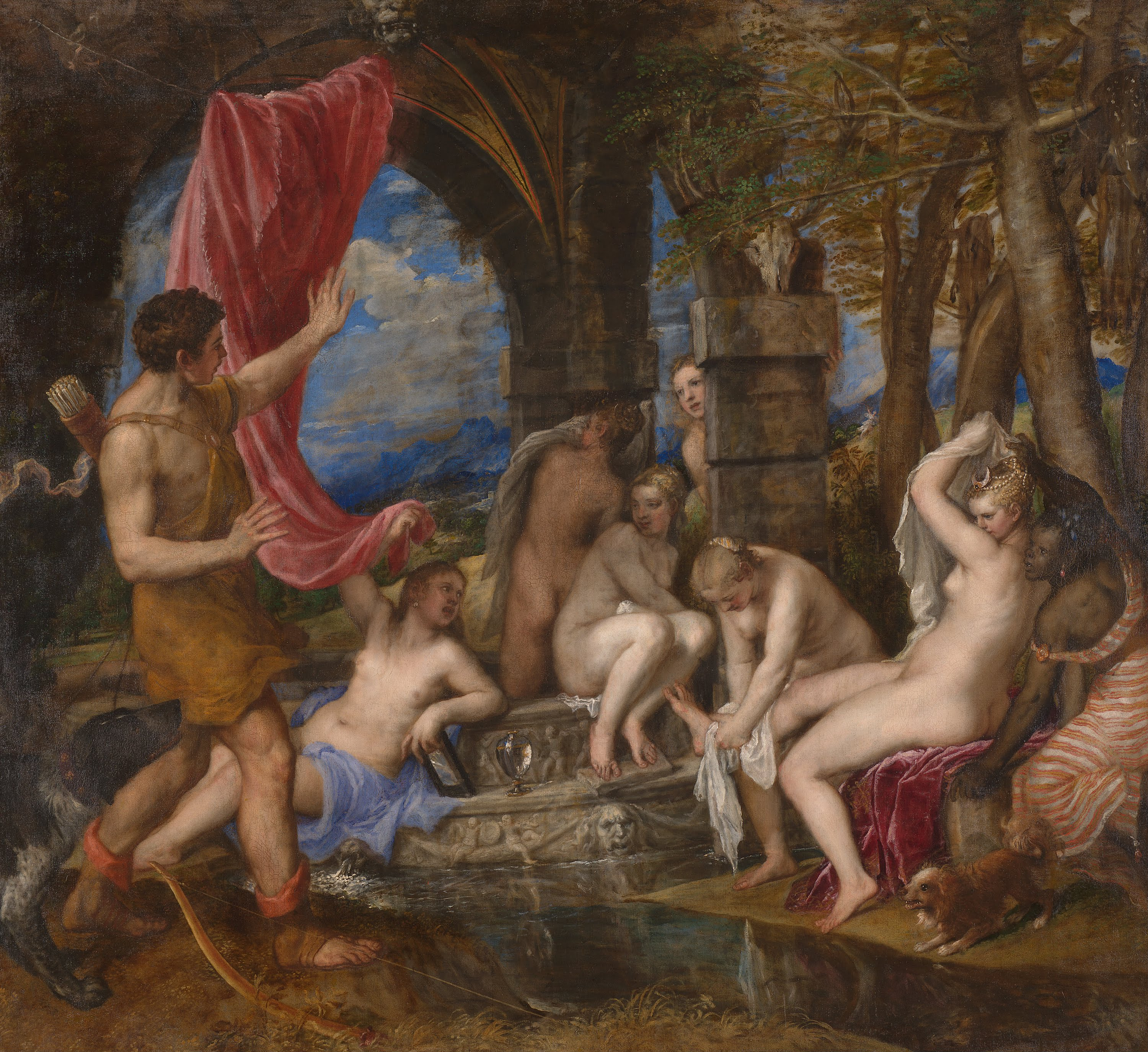
Diana and Actaeon by Titian (1556–59)

In the second century AD, the traveller Pausanias was shown a spring on the road in Attica leading to Plataea from Eleutherae, just beyond Megara "and a little farther on a rock. It is called the bed of Actaeon, for it is said that he slept thereon when weary with hunting and that into this spring he looked while Artemis was bathing in it."

"As to Actæon there is a tradition at Orchomenus, that a spectre which sat on a stone injured their land. And when they consulted the oracle at Delphi, the god bade them bury in the ground whatever remains they could find of Actæon: he also bade them to make a brazen copy of the spectre and fasten it with iron to the stone. This I have myself seen, and they annually offer funeral rites to Actæon."

== Parallels in Akkadian and Ugarit poems ==
In the standard version of the Epic of Gilgamesh (tablet vi) there is a parallel, in the series of examples Gilgamesh gives Ishtar of her mistreatment of her serial lovers:

You loved the herdsman, shepherd and chief shepherd
Who was always heaping up the glowing ashes for you,
And cooked ewe-lambs for you every day.
But you hit him and turned him into a wolf,
His own herd-boys hunt him down
And his dogs tear at his haunches.

Actaeon, torn apart by dogs incited by Artemis, finds another Near Eastern parallel in the Ugaritic hero Aqht, torn apart by eagles incited by Anath who wanted his hunting bow.

The virginal Artemis of classical times is not directly comparable to Ishtar of the many lovers, but the mytheme of Artemis shooting Orion, was linked to her punishment of Actaeon by T.C.W. Stinton; the Greek context of the mortal's reproach to the amorous goddess is translated to the episode of Anchises and Aphrodite. Daphnis too was a herdsman loved by a goddess and punished by her: see Theocritus' First Idyll.

== Symbolism regarding Actaeon ==
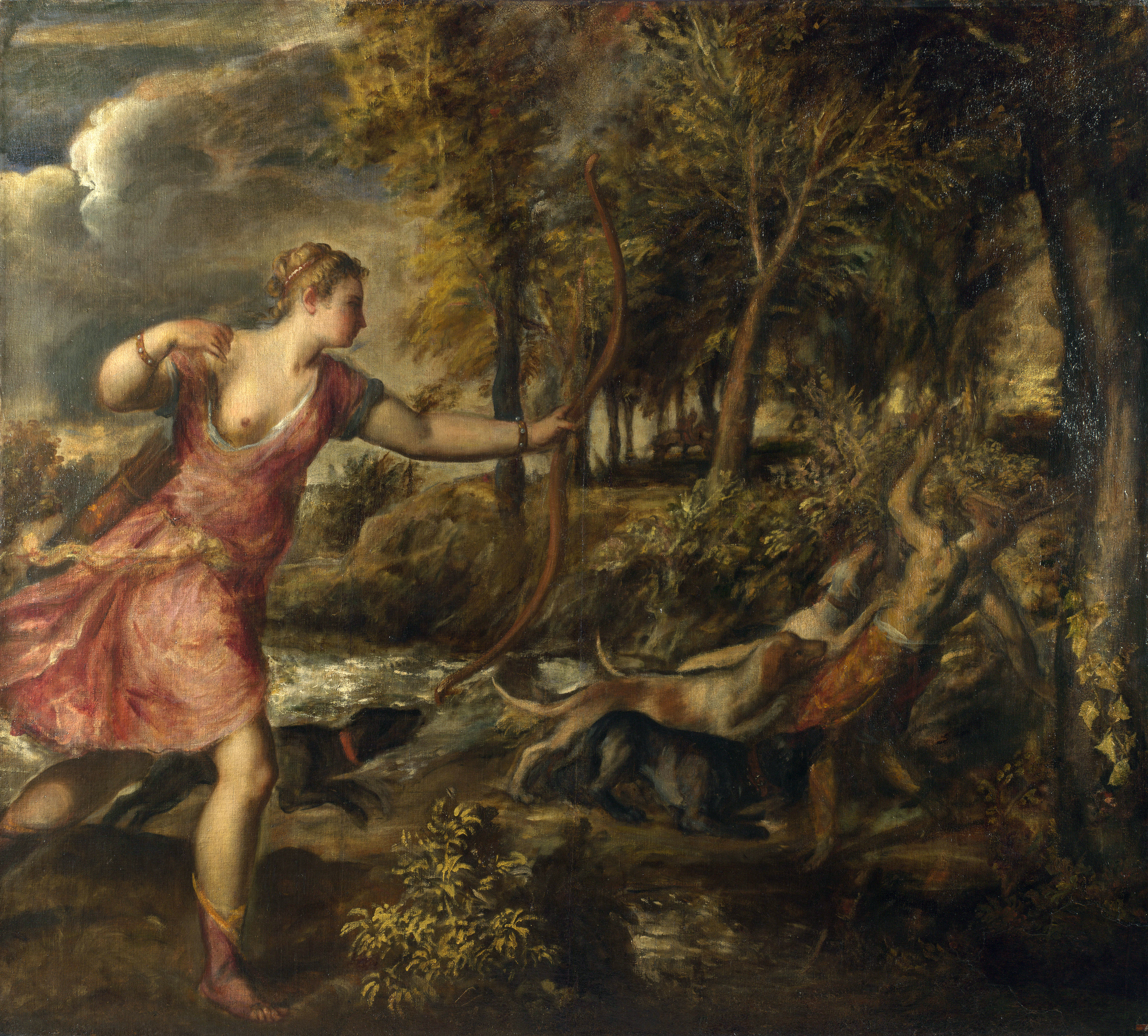
Death of Actaeon by Titian

In Greek Mythology, Actaeon is widely thought to symbolize ritual human sacrifice in attempt to please a God or Goddess: the dogs symbolize the sacrificers and Actaeon symbolizes the sacrifice. Actaeon may symbolize human curiosity or irreverence.

In Giordano Bruno’s philosophy, Actaeon is a central allegorical figure in his dialogue De gli eroici furori (On the Heroic Frenzies, 1585). Bruno reinterprets the myth as a metaphor for the intellectual pursuit of divine truth. Actaeon represents the philosopher who, driven by an insatiable desire for knowledge, seeks to contemplate the divine. The vision of Diana, encountered while she bathes, symbolizes the apprehension of divine beauty and truth, which manifest themselves through the multiplicity of nature while remaining ultimately infinite and inaccessible to ordinary human understanding. This vision transforms the observer: Actaeon becomes a stag, symbolizing the overcoming of ordinary human consciousness, while his hounds represent the faculties of the soul that turn against their master, consuming the individual self in the pursuit of infinite knowledge. Through this allegory, Bruno presents philosophical contemplation as a process of self-transcendence in which the seeker, having abandoned the limitations of individual existence, ultimately becomes united with the divine object of his quest.

The myth is seen by Jungian psychologist Wolfgang Giegerich as a symbol of spiritual transformation and/or enlightenment. Actaeon often symbolizes a cuckold, as when he is turned into a stag, he becomes "horned". This is alluded to in Shakespeare's Merry Wives, Robert Burton's Anatomy of Melancholy, and others.

== Cultural depictions ==
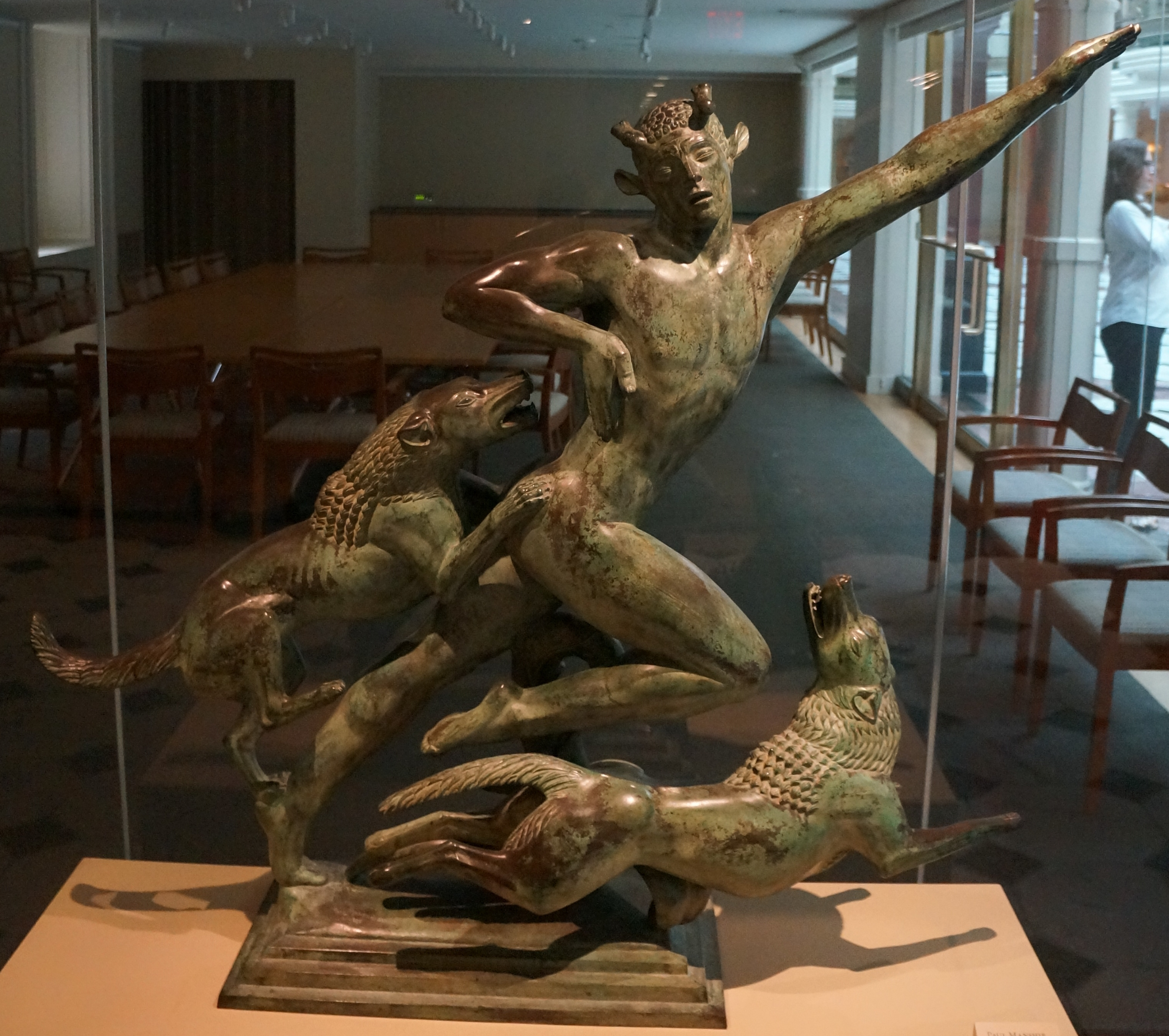
Actaeon by Paul Manship

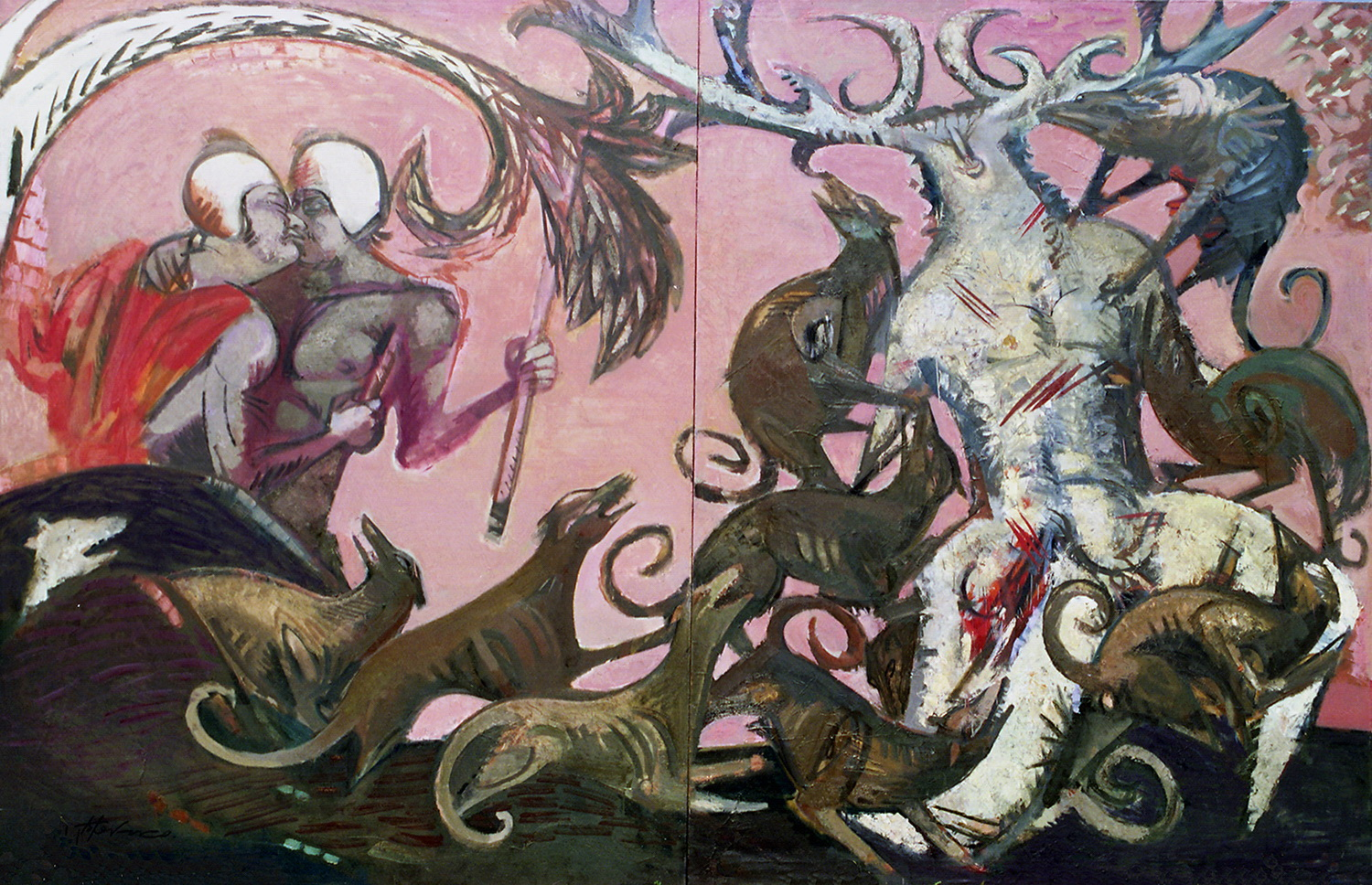
Vasiliy Ryabchenko, The Death of Actaeon, oil on canvas, 1988

The two main scenes are Actaeon surprising Artemis/Diana, and his death. In classical art Actaeon is normally shown as fully human, even as his hounds are killing him (sometimes he has small horns), but in Renaissance art he is often given a deer's head with antlers even in the scene with Diana, and by the time he is killed he has at the least this head, and has often completely transformed into the shape of a deer.

- Aeschylus and other tragic poets made use of the story, which was a favourite subject in ancient works of art.
- There is a well-known small marble group in the British Museum illustrative of the story, in gallery 83/84.
- Two paintings by the 16th century painter Titian (Death of Actaeon and Diana and Actaeon).
- Actéon, an operatic pastorale by Marc-Antoine Charpentier.
- Percy Bysshe Shelley suggests a parallel between his alter-ego and Actaeon in his elegy for John Keats, Adonais, stanza 31 ('[he] had gazed on Nature's naked loveliness/ Actaeon-like, and now he fled astray/ .../ And his own thoughts, along that rugged way,/ Pursued, like raging hounds, their father and their prey.')
- The aria "Oft she visits this lone mountain" from Purcell's Dido and Aeneas, first performed in 1689 or earlier.
- In canto V of Giambattista Marino's poem Adone the protagonist goes to theater to see a tragedy representing the myth of Actaeon. This episode foreshadows the protagonist's violent death at the end of the book.
- In Act I Scene 2 of Jacques Offenbach's Orpheus in the Underworld, Actaeon is Diana (Artemis)'s lover, and it is Jupiter who turns him into a stag, which puts Diana off hunting. His story is relinquished at this point, in favour of the other plots.
- Ted Hughes wrote a version of the story in his Tales from Ovid.
- Diane and Actéon Pas de Deux from Marius Petipa's ballet, Le Roi Candaule, to the music by Riccardo Drigo and Cesare Pugni, later incorporated into the second act of La Esmeralda (ballet).
- In Twelfth Night by William Shakespeare, Orsino compares his unrequited love for Olivia to the fate of Actaeon. "O, when mine eyes did see Olivia first, Methought she purged the air of pestilence, That instant was I turned into a hart, and my desires like fell and cruel hounds e'er since pursue me." Act 1 Scene 1.
- In Christopher Marlowe's play Edward II, courtier Piers Gaveston seeks to entertain his lover, King Edward II of England, by presenting a play based on the Actaeon myth. In Gaveston's version, Diane is played by a naked boy holding an olive branch to hide his loins, and it is the boy-Diane who transforms Actaeon into a hart and lets him be devoured by the hounds. Thus, Gaveston's (and Marlowe's) interpretation adds a strong element of homoeroticism, absent from the original myth.
- Paul Manship in 1925 created a set of copper statute of Diane and Actaeon, which is in the Luce Lunder Smithsonian Institution.
- French based collective LFKs and his film/theatre director, writer and visual artist Jean Michel Bruyere produced a series of 600 shorts and "medium" films, an interactive 360° installation, Si poteris narrare licet ("if you are able to speak of it, then you may do so") in 2002, a 3D 360° installation La Dispersion du Fils (from 2008 to 2016) and an outdoor performance, Une Brutalité pastorale (2000) all about the myth of Diana and Actaeon.
- In Matthew Barney's 2019 movie Redoubt set in the Sawtooth Mountains of the U.S. state of Idaho and an accompanying traveling art exhibition originating at the Yale University Art Gallery the myth is retold by the visual artist and filmmaker via avenues of his own design.
- Seamus Heaney's collection North contains an aisling concerning the myth of Diana and Actaeon.
- John Cheever's short story "Metamorphoses," Part I, is a 20th-century reenactment of the fate of Actaeon.

== Royal House of Thebes family tree ==
Royal House of Thebes
- Solid lines indicate descendants.
- Dashed lines indicate marriages.
- Dotted lines indicate extra-marital relationships or adoptions.
- Kings of Thebes are numbered with bold names and a light purple background.
  - Joint rules are indicated by a number and lowercase letter, for example, 5a. Amphion shared the throne with 5b. Zethus.
- Regents of Thebes are alphanumbered (format AN) with bold names and a light red background.
  - The number N refers to the regency preceding the reign of the N^{th} king. Generally this means the regent served the N^{th} king but not always, as Creon (A9) was serving as regent to Laodamas (the 10th King) when he was slain by Lycus II (the usurping 9th king).
  - The letter A refers to the regency sequence. "A" is the first regent, "B" is the second, etc.
- Deities have a yellow background color.

Harmonia	1. Cadmus	Polyxo	A4. Nycteus (Regent)	Dirce	B4 & A6. Lycus (Regent)
Zeus	Zeus
Ino	Agave	Echion	3. Polydorus	Nycteis	Antiope
Semele	Autonoë
Dionysus	2. Pentheus	Epeiros	4. Labdacus	5a. Amphion	5b. Zethus
Oclasus
Menoeceus
Eurydice	A7, A8 & A9. Creon (Regent)	Jocasta	6. Laius	Merope	Polybus
Hipponome	Alcaeus
Zeus
Alcmene	Amphitryon	Perimede	7. Oedipus
Megara	Heracles	Iphicles	Anaxo
Henioche	Megareus	Haemon	Antigone	8b. Eteocles	Argea	8a. Polynices
Pyrrha	Lycomedes	Ismene	9. Lycus II
A12. Peneleos (Regent)	10. Laodamas	Demonassa	11. Thersander
Opheltes	12. Tisamenus
14. Damasichthon	13. Autesion
15. Ptolemy	Theras	Argeia	Aristodemus
16. Xanthos	Eurysthenes	Procles

== Names of dogs ==
Some ancient authors, including Ovid, Hyginus, and Apollodorus, provide catalogues of the dogs' names.

List of Actaeon's dogs
Dogs	Source				Bitches	Source			
Dogs	Apollodorus	Ovid	Hyginus		Bitches	Apollodorus	Ovid	Hyginus	
Dogs	Apollodorus	Ovid	Ovid	Other author	Bitches	Apollodorus	Ovid	Ovid	Other author
Acamas				✓	Aello (Storm)		✓	✓	
Aethon				✓	Alce (Stout)		✓	✓	
Agrius				✓	Agre (Chaser)		✓	✓	
Amarynthus	✓				Arcena	✓			
Arcas			?		Arethusa				✓
Argiodus (Towser)		✓	✓		Argo				✓
Asbolos (Sooty)		✓	✓		Aura			?	
Balius (Dappled)	✓				Canace (Barker)		✓	✓	
Borax				✓	Chediaetros*				✓
Bores	✓				Cyllo				✓
Boreas				✓	Dinomache				✓
Charops				✓	Dioxippe				✓
Corus				✓	Echione				✓
Cyllopodes				✓	Gorgo				✓
Cyprius			?		Harpyia (Harpy)		✓	✓	✓
Dorceus (Quicksight)		✓	✓		Lachne (Bristle)		✓	✓	
Draco				✓	Lacaena				✓
Dromas (Racer)		✓	✓		Leaena				✓
Dromius				✓	Lycisca (Wolfet)		✓	✓	
Echnobas			?		Lynceste				✓
Elion			?		Melanchaetes (Blackmane)		✓	✓	
Gnosius			?		Nape (Wildwood)		✓	✓	
Eudromus				✓	Ocydrome				✓
Haemon				✓	Ocypete				✓
Harpalicus				✓	Oresitrophos (Rover)		✓	✓	
Harpalos (Snap)		✓	✓		Orias				✓
Hylactor (Babbler)		✓	✓		Oxyrhoe				✓
Hylaeus (Woodranger)		✓	✓		Poemenis (Shepherdess)		✓	✓	
Ichneus				✓	Sagnos*				
Ichnobates (Tracer)		✓	✓		Sticte (Spot)		✓	✓	
Labros (Wildtooth)		✓	✓		Theriope				✓
Lacon		✓	✓		Theriphone				✓
Ladon		✓	✓		Therodamas (Savage)		✓	✓	
Laelaps (Hunter)		✓	✓		Therodanapis			?	
Lampus				✓	Urania				✓
Leon				✓	Volatos*				✓
Leucon (Blanche)		✓	✓		Number	1	13	15	20
Lynceus	✓			✓					
Machimus				✓					
Melampus (Blackfoot)		✓	✓	✓					
Melaneus (Blackcoat)		✓	✓						
Obrimus				✓					
Ocydromus				✓					
Ocythous				✓					
Omargus	✓								
Nebrophonos (Killbuck)		✓	✓						
Oribasos (Surefoot)		✓	✓						
Pachylus				✓					
Pamphagos (Glutton)		✓	✓						
Pterelas (Wingfoot)		✓	✓						
Spartus	✓								
Stilbon				✓					
Syrus				✓					
Theron (Tempest)		✓	✓						
Thoos (Quickfoot)		✓	✓						
Tigris (Tiger)		✓	✓						
Zephyrus				✓					
Number	6	22	27	26					

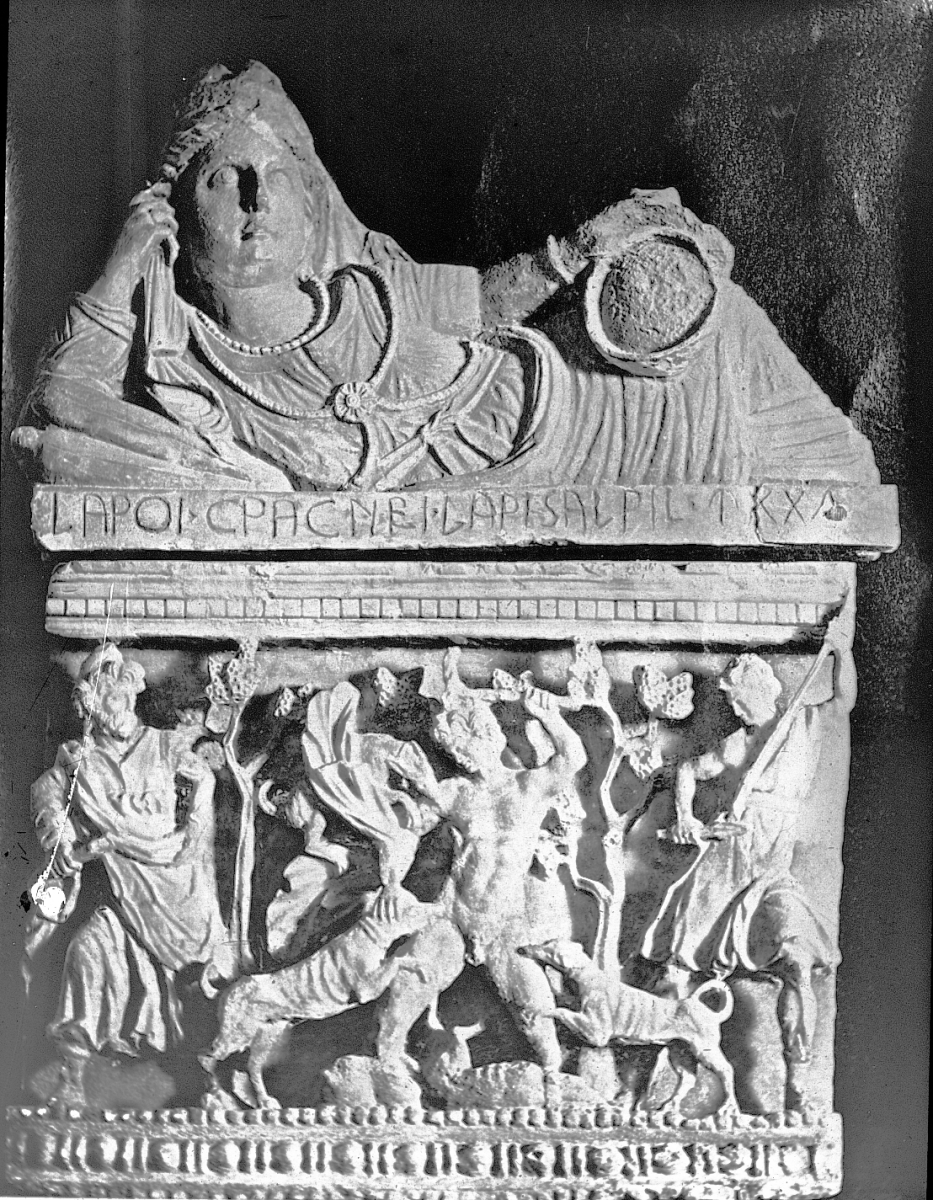
Volterra, Italy. Etruscan cinerary urn; Actaeon torn by the dogs of Diana, Volterra. Brooklyn Museum Archives, Goodyear Archival Collection

Notes:

- Names of dogs were verified to correspond to the list given in Ovid's text where the names were already transliterated.
- ? = Seven listed names of dogs in Hyginus' Fabulae, was probably misread or misinterpreted by later authors because it does not correspond to the exact numbers and names given by Ovid:
  - Arcas signifies Arcadia, place of origin of three dogs namely Pamphagos, Dorceus and Oribasus
  - Cyprius means Cyprus, where the dogs Lysisca and Harpalos originated
  - Gnosius can be read as Knossus in Crete, which signify that Ichnobates was a Knossian breed of dog
  - Echnobas, Elion, Aura and Therodanapis were probably place names or adjectives defining the characteristics of dogs

== See also ==
- Cynegeticus
- Leucone
