= Harpalus (disambiguation) =

Harpalus or Harpalos (Ancient Greek: Ἅρπαλος) may refer to:

== Greek Antiquity ==
- Harpalus courtier of Alexander the Great and embezzler of the Persian treasure.
- Harpalus (astronomer) astronomer of 5th-century BC
- Harpalus (engineer) supposed engineer of Xerxes in the Hellespont
- Harpalus (son of Polemaeus) statesman of Perseus of Macedon
- Harpalus (mythology) mythological character of Laconia
- Harpalos, one of the dogs that tore apart Actaeon

== Science ==
- Harpalus (beetle) of carabid beetles
- Harpalus (crater) on the Moon
