= Rhoecus (disambiguation) =

Rhoecus can refer to:

- Rhoecus, ancient Greek sculptor from Samos
- Rhoecus (mythology), people named Rhoecus in Greek myth
