= Elion =

Elion may refer to:

- Gertrude B. Elion (1918–1999), American biochemist and recipient of the 1988 Nobel Prize in Physiology or Medicine
- Jacques Elion, French molecular biologist and geneticist
- Elion Enterprises Limited, an Estonian company
- Elyon, the highest God in the Canaanite pantheon (along with El)
- Elion Group
- eLion electrical bus manufactured by Lion Bus company
- Lawrence Elion (1917–2011), Canadian / British actor
- Loup-Denis Elion (born 1979), French actor and singer
- Elion, a deer in the book Fire Bringer
- Elion, one of the dogs that tore apart Actaeon

== See also ==
- Eilon, settlement in Israel
