= Borax, Nevada =

Ghost town in the United States

Borax
- Ghost town
- Location within Nevada Location within the United States
- Coordinates: 35°42′52″N 115°20′26″W
- Country: United States
- State: Nevada
- County: Clark
- Elevation: 2,707 ft (825 m)

Population (2010)
  - Total: 0
- Time zone: UTC-8 (Pacific (PST))
  - Summer (DST): UTC-7 (PDT)
- ZIP code: 89026
- Area code: 702
- GNIS feature ID: 855974

Borax is a ghost town and railroad siding in Clark County, Nevada, United States located along the Union Pacific Railroad east of Interstate 15.

== History ==
Borax was settled in 1905, and named for the borax deposits in the region. In c. 1940, the population of Borax was 10.

As of 2021, there are no buildings that remain in Borax and the site exists as a railroad siding along the Union Pacific Railroad.
