= Ladon =

Ladon may refer to:

Geography

- Ladon (river) in Arcadia, Greece
- Ladon (river of Elis) in Elis, Greece
- Ladon, Loiret, a commune in the Loiret département of France

Games

- Ladon (playing card), a low value card in Tarock (Tarot) games
- Ladon, the dragon god in the video game Breath of Fire III

Mythology

- Ladon (mythology), one of the dragons in Greek mythology
- Ladon, husband of Stymphalis and father of Daphne and Metope
- Ladon, one of the dogs that tore apart Actaeon
