= Asbolus (disambiguation) =

Asbolus may refer to:

- Asbolus, a centaur seer in Greek mythology
- Asbolus (beetle), a genus of beetle
- 8405 Asbolus, a minor planet
- Asbolos, one of the dogs that tore apart Actaeon
