= James Wright (inventor) =

Scottish-born inventor

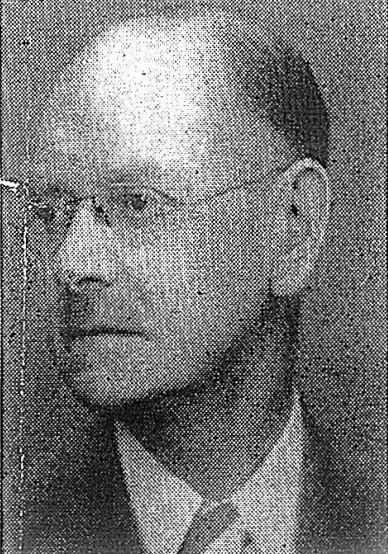
- Born: James Gilbert Ernest Wright; 16 January 1883; Glasgow, Scotland
- Died: 14 August 1959 (aged 76)
- Occupation: Inventor

James Gilbert Ernest Wright (16 January 1883 – 14 August 1959) was a Scottish-born inventor, researcher and chemical engineer at General Electric who invented Silly Putty in 1943 while looking for a replacement for rubber.

== Life ==
Wright was born in Glasgow on January 16, 1883. He was the superintendent of the celluloid thread department of the Edison and Swan United Electric Light Company and was a chemist for the South Benwell plant at Newcastle-upon-Tyne. He emigrated to the United States in 1913 and worked for 35 years at the research laboratories of General Electric in Schenectady, New York. He worked on the first submarine detection device and on the development of Glyptol.

Wright's inventions for General Electric were a method of restoring shrunken celluloid photographic films to their original condition, and a process of treating metals to protect against oxidation and corrosion.

== Silly Putty ==
The invention of Nutty Putty, later renamed Silly Putty, was an accident. During World War II, the United States could not obtain natural rubber from Asian suppliers, who gathered it from rubber trees. The General Electric Company was under a government contract to create an inexpensive substitute for synthetic rubber for the war effort. James Wright, an engineer at General Electric's New Haven laboratory, was working with silicone oil—a clear, gooey compound composed of silicon bonded to several other elements. By substituting silicon for carbon, the main element in rubber, Wright hoped to create a new compound with all the flexibility and bounce of rubber.

In 1943, Wright made a surprising discovery. He mixed boric acid with silicone oil in a test tube. Instead of forming the hard rubber material he was looking for, the compound remained slightly gooey to the touch. Disappointed with the results, he tossed a gob of the material from the test tube onto the floor. To his surprise, the gob bounced. The new compound was very bouncy and could be stretched and pulled. However, it was not a good rubber substitute, so Wright and other GE scientists continued their search.

Seven years later, a toy seller named Peter Hodgson packaged some of Wright's creation in a small plastic egg and presented his new product at the 1950 International Toy Fair in New York. Its first name was Nutty Putty but was changed later due to marketing concerns. It is now called Silly Putty; more than 300 million eggs containing the material have been sold since.

== Spiritualism ==
Wright converted to spiritualism after conducting experiments with mediums. It is alleged that Wright and his associate Harry Gardner received messages from Thomas Edison through the mediumship of Mary Olson in 1941. They searched for blueprints of a machine that Edison was alleged to have built to contact spirits. After finding the missing blueprints they built the device, but could not make it work. They later created their own machine utilizing an aluminium trumpet connected to the top of a microphone enclosed in a sound box.
