= Slime (homemade toy) =

Homemade toy

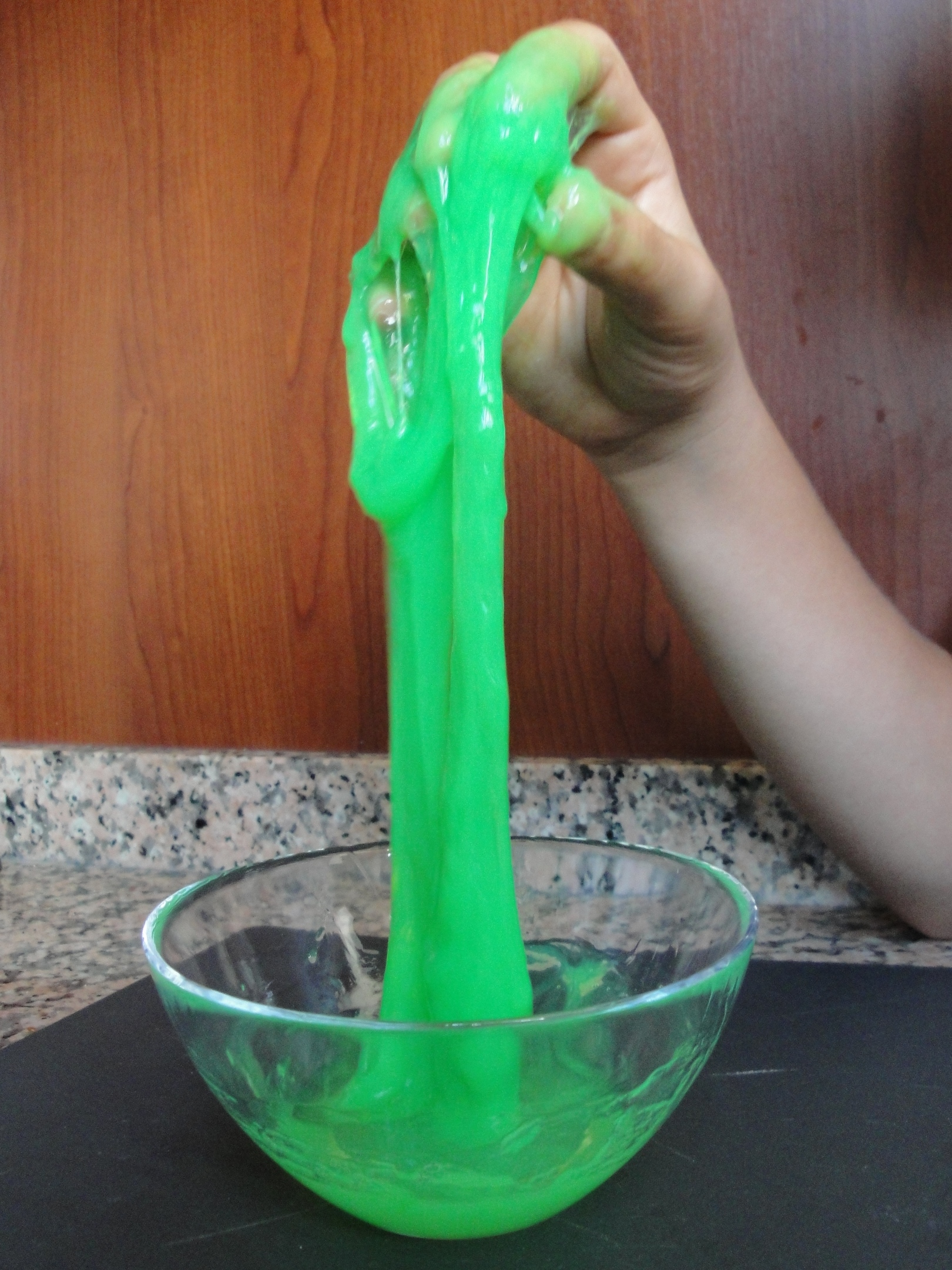
A green-colored homemade slime

Slime (or flubber) is a homemade toy typically created using a combination of water, glue, and borax. Videos of people playing with slime became popular on social media in the mid-2010s, which made it an international trend.

== Recipe ==
Slime is customarily made of water, PVA-based glue, and borax. Its recipe can vary based on the desired color, consistency, or scent of the slime; additions can include dyes or sequins. Other recipes for slime include shampoo, soap, corn starch, body lotion, and shaving cream. Variations of slime include glow-in-the-dark, fluffy, glitter, clear, cloud, and metallic. In the United Kingdom, where, as of 2018, borax has been banned for its toxicity and potential to affect fertility, baking soda is a popular substitute. A 2018 survey by British consumer association Which?, however, found that eight of the 11 slime products they tested contained more than the European Union's legal limit of 300mg/kg of boron.

== Chemistry ==
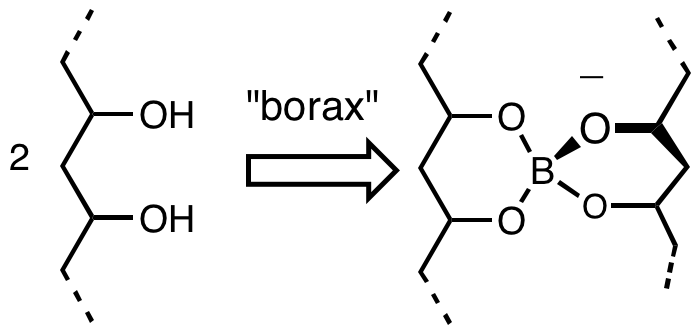
Structure for borate ester that comprises crosslinking in "slime"

The gelation process entails formation of a borate ester that cross links the chains of the PVA. Borate esters form readily by condensation of hydroxyl groups and the B-OH groups.

Slime's unique texture comes from a polymer network formed by polyvinyl alcohol. Weak hydrogen bonds hold the polymer chains together, while borate molecules link them side by side. These weak bonds give slime its distinctive ability to stretch, flow, and pull apart.

Slime is a non-Newtonian fluid that flows under low stress, but breaks under higher stresses and pressures. This combination of fluid-like and solid-like properties makes it a Maxwell fluid. Its behavior can also be described as being viscoplastic or gelatinous.

== History ==
=== Social media trend ===
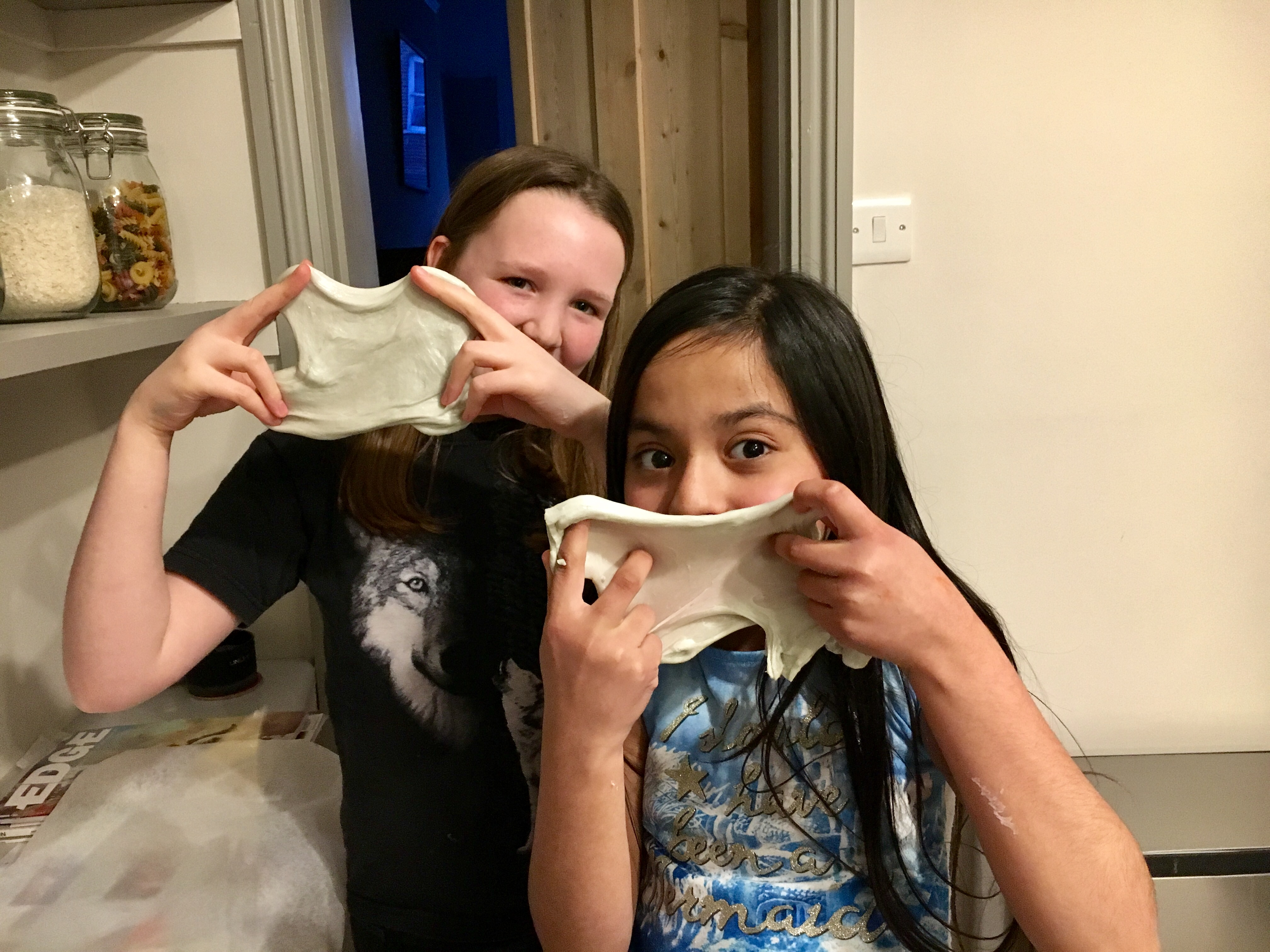
Two young girls holding up slime made using glue, baking soda, shaving cream, food coloring, and contact lens solution

In 2014, Thai videos of pastel slime began being posted on Instagram. The Instagram accounts of Thai teenage girls posting videos of slime became popular globally in 2016, leading to it being known as "Thai slime". The hashtag #slime also started to grow in usage in 2016 among "slimers", the Instagram community of slime makers. Google searches for slime began to rise in the summer of 2016 and peaked in 2017, when slime became an international trend on social media, largely among young children.

By 2017 and 2018, videos of hands stretching and playing with slime trended and became a popular form of ASMR on Instagram and YouTube. California-based YouTuber Karina Garcia, who has been credited with starting the social media trend of homemade slime and was called "a doyenne of the slime world" by Hannah Jane Parkinson of The Guardian, became known as the "slime queen" and gained over 7 million subscribers by 2018; slime YouTubers such as Theresa Nguyen and ItsJustNick also gained millions of subscribers and earned thousands of dollars through sponsorships and advertisements on their videos. Instagram began posting slime videos to its official account in 2018 along with captions about those running the accounts behind the videos. In 2020, Michelle Santiago Cortés of Refinery29 called slime "the biggest Instagram trend of the last decade".

=== Products and sales ===
Prior to the rise of homemade slime in the 2010s, slime toys like Silly Putty, Floam, the Nickelodeon- and Mattel-manufactured Gak, and Mattel's Slime had been brief trends since the 1970s. Nickelodeon also began using a bright green and viscous kind of slime in their marketing and at the Kids' Choice Awards in the 1990s, though its makeup differs greatly from typical homemade slime.

In December 2016, following the increased interest in slime on social media, Elmer's experienced a 50 percent increase in sales for their glue and later released a commercial for "kid-friendly" slime recipes without borax. In March 2017, Newell Brands, the parent company of Elmer's, announced that it would be increasing its glue production to meet the demands of the slime craze. Also in early 2017, Elmer's created a team of chemists and researchers to focus on the slime trend. On Etsy, vendors sold batches of their own homemade slime in the late 2010s. Also by 2018, American retailers like Walmart and Target and British retailers like WHSmith were investing in slime-related products. The Blackburn-based slime company Zimpli Kids, according to its spokesperson, experienced significant growth in their sales from 2016 to 2018 and sold their powder to slime YouTubers.

=== Other ===
In 2017 and 2018, as slime rose in popularity on social media, it also became a popular theme in fashion, with slime-themed garments appearing on runways for Jeremy Scott and Adam Selman and Vogue France releasing its own slime video. The Sloomoo Institute, a slime museum, was opened in Tribeca, New York City in October 2019.

=== Explanations for popularity ===
For Splinter, Cara Rose DeFabio wrote that the slime trend in the 2010s could be attributed to its affordability—considering its use of common household materials—social media content featuring slime not having a language barrier, nostalgia, and its ASMR properties. The shareability of slime recipes and the potential for profit from selling slime have also been posited as reasons for its success.

== Toxicity scare ==
In 2018, Which? reported that eight out of eleven commercial slime lines from Amazon contained boron levels that exceeded European Union safety standards. Slime uses borax, a compound of boron, to give itself a gelatinous texture. Parents were warned that excessive exposure to boron can cause skin irritation, diarrhoea, vomiting and cramps. However, according to Snopes, claims about slime's carcinogenicity, reproductive toxicity, and neurotoxicity were either false or unlikely to matter in the concentrations available to consumers and through their typical routes of exposure.
