= Borax method =

Technique of artisanal gold mining

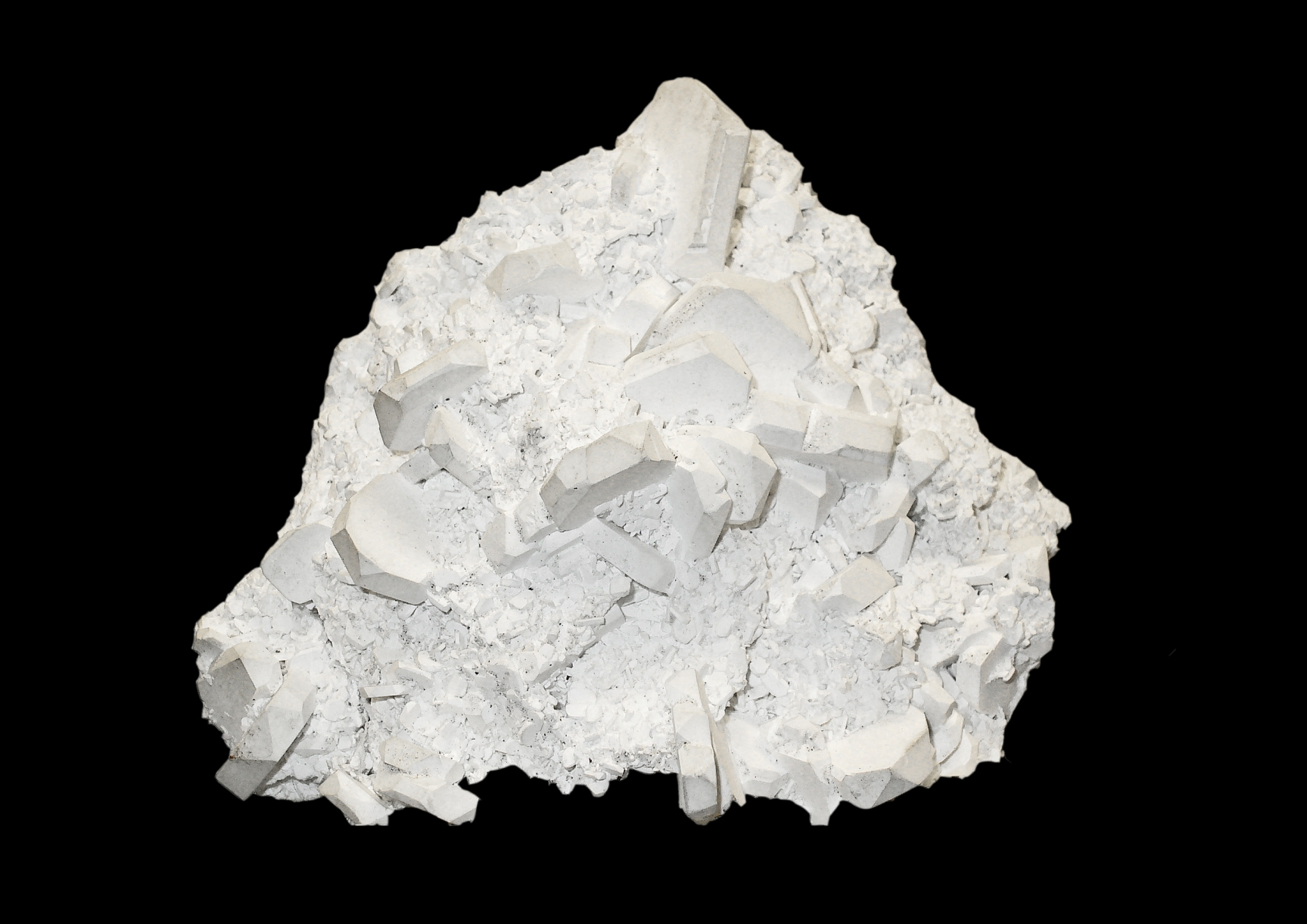
Borax is a crystal-forming mineral that can be reduced to a powder, in this case for use as a flux.

The borax method is a technique of artisanal gold mining, which uses borax as a flux to purify gold concentrates. By using borax, no mercury flour is produced, hence gold recovery increases.

== History ==
The borax method of gold extraction has been used by artisanal gold miners in the Benguet area north of Manila in the Philippines for more than 30 years. Some believe it was in practice as early as the 1900s. The method is increasingly being seen as a safe alternative to the widespread use of toxic mercury in artisanal gold mining today. About 30% of the world's mercury emissions comes from small scale mining. Efforts are being made to revive the method and spread its use. As of 2012, around 15,000 artisanal gold miners in a small area of Luzon, the main island in the northern portion of the Philippines, use this method exclusively. Borax is similar in price to mercury and can recover up to three times more gold than mercury amalgamation processes, according to a 2018 IGF report.

== Chemistry ==
In contrast to the use of mercury (which relies on amalgamation of the gold to coalesce it and separate it from impurities) this method relies on borax's ability to lower all the minerals' melting points. Since the gold is usually the heaviest of these minerals, it allows for concentrating the gold on the bottom of the crucible. Adding borax reduces the melting point of the material to a level accessible to small-scale miners.

After the ore is crushed into a fine powder, it's lightly panned to leave only the heaviest minerals in the pan. It's then thoroughly mixed with three times its volume in borax, and a few drops of water. This mixture is then heated until the whole mixture is molten, after which molten droplets of gold collect on the bottom of the crucible.

== See also ==
- Pollution related to gold mining
