= Borax =

Boron compound, a salt of boric acid

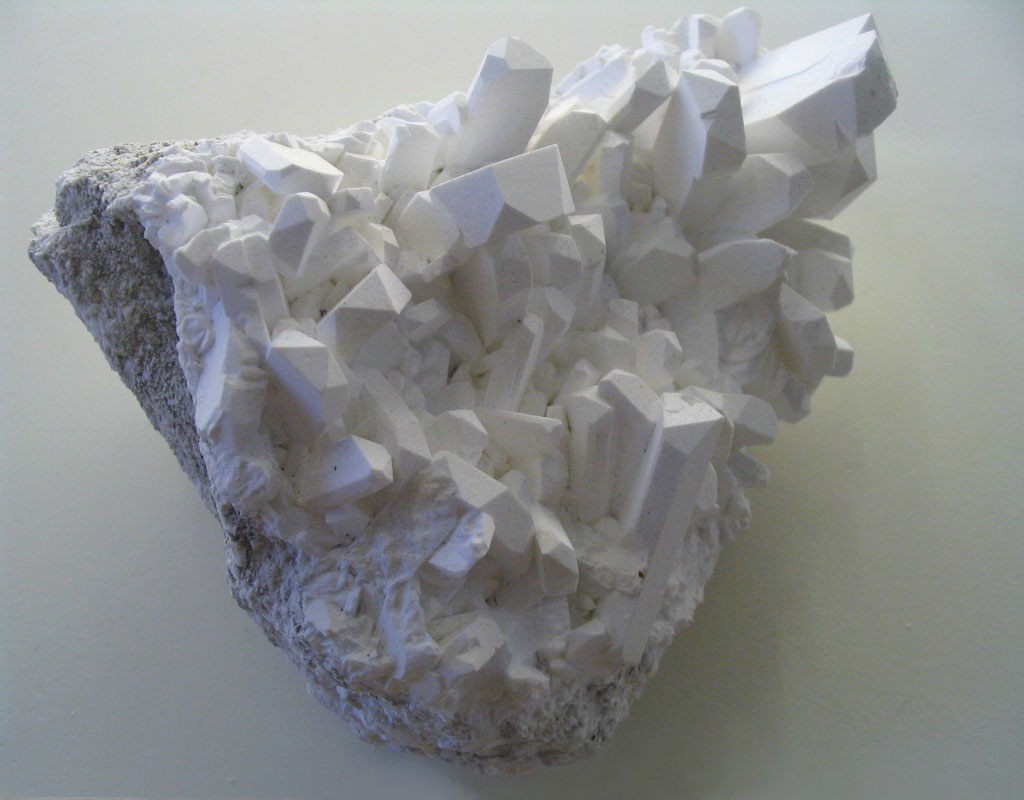
- Borax crystals

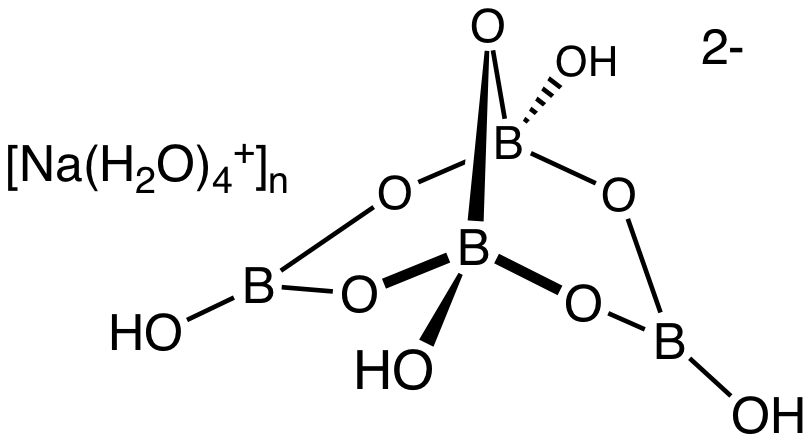
- Ball-and-stick model of the unit cell of borax decahydrate

Names
- IUPAC name disodium;3,7-dioxido-2,4,6,8,9-pentaoxa-1,3,5,7-tetraborabicyclo[3.3.1]nonane;decahydrate
- Other names: Borax decahydrate; Sodium borate decahydrate; Sodium tetraborate decahydrate; Sodium tetrahydroxy tetraborate hexahydrate

Identifiers
CAS Number	1303-96-4
3D model (JSmol)	Interactive image
ChEBI	CHEBI:86222
ChEMBL	ChEMBL3833375
ChemSpider	17339255
EC Number	603-411-9
E number	E285 (preservatives)
KEGG	D03243
PubChem CID	16211214
RTECS number	VZ2275000
UNII	91MBZ8H3QO
CompTox Dashboard (EPA)	DTXSID101014358
- InChI: InChI=1S/B4O7.2Na.10H2O/c5-1-7-3-9-2(6)10-4(8-1)11-3;;;;;;;;;;;;/h;;;10*1H2/q-2;2*+1;;;;;;;;;; Key: CDMADVZSLOHIFP-UHFFFAOYSA-N; InChI=1/B4O7.2Na.10H2O/c5-1-7-3-9-2(6)10-4(8-1)11-3;;;;;;;;;;;;/h;;;10*1H2/q-2;2*+1;;;;;;;;;; Key: CDMADVZSLOHIFP-UHFFFAOYAP
- SMILES: [Na+].[Na+].O0B(O)O[B-]1(O)OB(O)O[B-]0(O)O1.O.O.O.O.O.O.O.O

Properties
Chemical formula	Na_{2}B_{4}O_{5}(OH)_{4}·8H_{2}O
Molar mass	381.36 g·mol^{−1}
Appearance	White or colorless crystalline solid
Density	1.73 g/cm^{3} (decahydrate, solid)
Melting point	743 °C (1,369 °F; 1,016 K) (anhydrous); 75 °C (decahydrate, decomposes)
Boiling point	1,575 °C (2,867 °F; 1,848 K) (anhydrous)
Solubility in water	31.7 g/L
Magnetic susceptibility (χ)	−85.0·10^{−6} cm^{3}/mol (anhydrous)
Refractive index (n_{D})	n_{1}=1.447, n_{2}=1.469, n_{3}=1.472 (decahydrate)

Structure
Crystal structure	Monoclinic, mS92, No. 15
Space group	C2/c
Point group	2/m
Lattice constant	a = 1.1885 nm, b = 1.0654 nm, c = 1.2206 nm α = 90°, β = 106.623°°, γ = 90°
Lattice volume (V)	1.4810 nm^{3}
Formula units (Z)	4

Pharmacology
ATC code	S01AX07 (WHO)

Hazards
- GHS labelling
Pictograms	(GHS08: Health hazard)
Hazard statements	H360
Precautionary statements	P201, P308+P313
NFPA 704 (fire diamond)	1 0 0
- NIOSH (US health exposure limits)
PEL (Permissible)	none
REL (Recommended)	TWA 1 mg/m^{3} (anhydrous and pentahydrate); TWA 5 mg/m^{3} (decahydrate)
IDLH (Immediate danger)	N.D.

Related compounds
Other anions	Sodium aluminate
Other cations	Lithium tetraborate
Related compounds	Boric acid, sodium perborate
- Except where otherwise noted, data are given for materials in their standard state (at 25 °C [77 °F], 100 kPa). Infobox references

Borax (also referred to as sodium borate, tincal (/ˈtɪŋkəl/) and tincar (/ˈtɪŋkər/)) is a salt (ionic compound) normally encountered as a hydrated borate of sodium, with the chemical formula Na_{2}H_{20}B_{4}O_{17}. (Note: It is also written as Na_{2}B_{4}O_{7}·10H_{2}O, which shows that it is a decahydrated tetraborate.) Borax mineral is a crystalline borate mineral that occurs in only a few places worldwide in quantities that enable it to be mined economically.

Borax can be dehydrated by heating into other forms with less water of hydration. The anhydrous form of borax can also be obtained from the decahydrate or other hydrates by heating and then grinding the resulting glasslike solid into a powder. It is a white crystalline solid that dissolves in water to make a basic solution due to the tetraborate anion.

Borax is commonly available in powder or granular form and has many industrial and household uses, including as a pesticide, as a metal soldering flux, as a component of glass, enamel, and pottery glazes, for tanning of skins and hides, for artificial aging of wood, as a preservative against wood fungus, as a food additive, and as a pharmaceutic alkalizer. In chemical laboratories it is used as a buffering agent.

The terms tincal and tincar refer to the naturally occurring borax historically mined from dry lake beds in various parts of Asia.

== History ==
Borax was first discovered in dry lake beds in Tibet. Native tincal from Tibet, Persia, and other parts of Asia was traded via the Silk Road to the Arabian Peninsula in the 8th century AD.

Borax first came into common use in the late 19th century when Francis Marion Smith's Pacific Coast Borax Company began to market and popularize a large variety of applications under the 20 Mule Team Borax trademark, named for the method by which borax was originally hauled out of the California and Nevada deserts.

== Etymology ==
The English word borax and its previous Middle form boras is a Latinate loan from Old French boras ~ bourras which may have been from Medieval Latin baurach (another English spelling), borac(-/um/em), borax, along with Spanish borrax (> borraj) and Italian borrace, in the 9th century, and from Arabic بورق bawraq ~ būraq ~ bōraq which is attested in Ibn Sayyar al-Warraq's Kitāb al-Ṭabīkh among many examples, from Middle Persian bwlk' (bōrag), which yielded Persian بوره bure.

The words tincal and tincar were adopted into English in the 17th century from Malay tingkal and from Urdu/Persian/Arabic تنکار tinkār/tankār; thus the two forms in English. These all appear to be related to the Sanskrit टांकण ṭānkaṇa.

== Chemistry ==
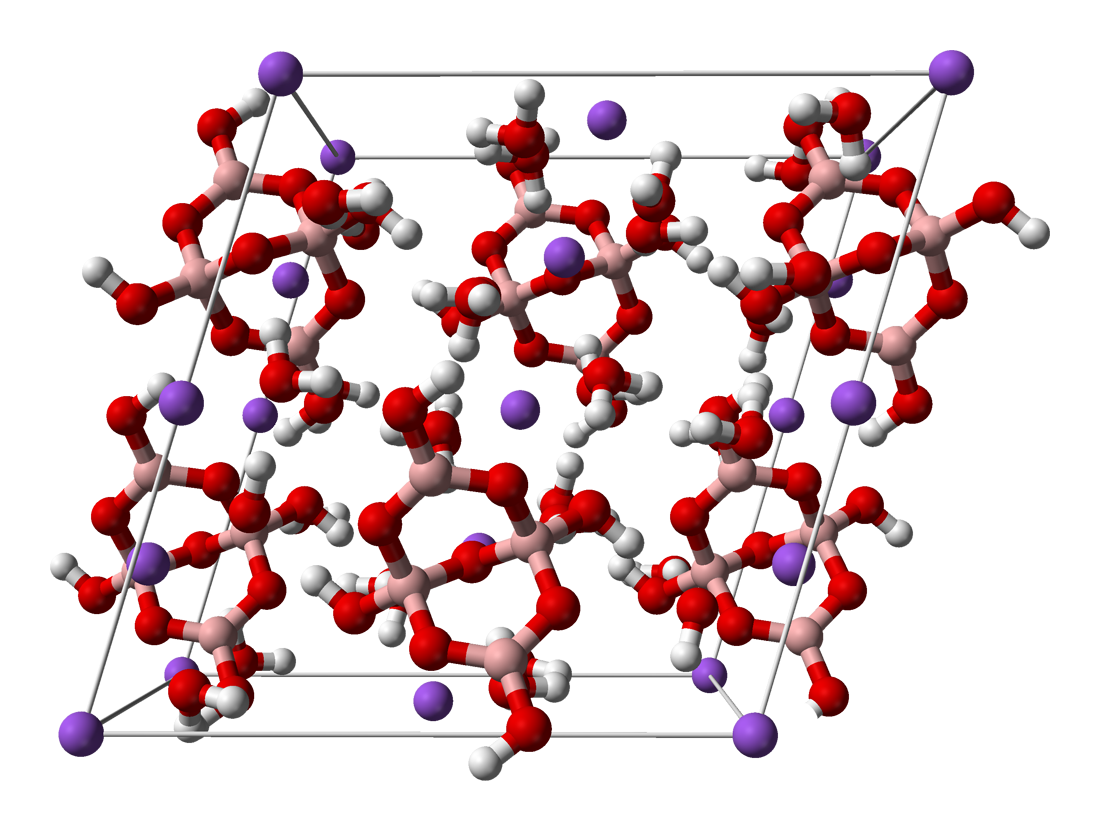
The structure of borax according to X-ray crystallography

From a chemical perspective, borax contains the [B_{4}O_{5}(OH)_{4}]^{2−} ion. This structure has two four-coordinate boron centers and two three-coordinate boron centers.

It is a proton conductor at temperatures above 21 °C (70 °F). Conductivity is maximum along the b axis.

Borax is also easily converted to boric acid and other borates, which have many applications. Its reaction with hydrochloric acid to form boric acid is

Na_{2}B_{4}O_{7}·10H_{2}O + 2 HCl → 4 H_{3}BO_{3} + 2 NaCl + 5 H_{2}O

Borax is sufficiently stable to find use as a primary standard for acid–base titrimetry.

Molten borax dissolves many metal oxides to form glasses. This property is important for its uses in metallurgy and for the borax bead test of qualitative chemical analysis.

Borax is soluble in a variety of solvents; however, it is notably insoluble in ethanol.

Solubility of borax in some solvents
Organic solvent	Temperature, °C (°F)	Borax % by mass in saturated solution
Glycerol 98.5%	20 (68)	52.60
Glycerol 86.5%	20 (68)	47.19
Ethylene glycol	25 (77)	41.60
Diethylene glycol	25 (77)	18.60
Methanol	25 (77)	19.90
Aqueous ethanol 46.5%	15.5 (60)	2.48
Acetone	25 (77)	0.60
Ethyl acetate	25 (77)	0.14

Solubility of borax in water
Temperature, °C (°F)	Borax % by mass in saturated solution
0 (32)	1.99
5 (41)	2.46
10 (50)	3.09
15 (59)	3.79
20 (68)	4.70
25 (77)	5.80
30 (86)	7.20
35 (95)	9.02
40 (104)	11.22
45 (113)	14.21
50 (122)	17.91
55 (131)	23.22
60 (140)	30.32
65 (149)	33.89
70 (158)	36.94
75 (167)	40.18
80 (176)	44.31
85 (185)	48.52
90 (194)	53.18
95 (203)	58.94
100 (212)	65.63

The term borax properly refers to the so-called "decahydrate" Na_{2}B_{4}O_{7}·10H_{2}O, but that name is not consistent with its structure. It is actually octahydrate. The anion is not tetraborate [B_{4}O_{7}]^{2−} but tetrahydroxy tetraborate [B_{4}O_{5}(OH)_{4}]^{2−}, so the more correct formula should be Na_{2}B_{4}O_{5}(OH)_{4}·8H_{2}O. However, the term may be applied also to the related compounds. Borax "pentahydrate" has the formula Na_{2}B_{4}O_{7}·5H_{2}O, which is actually a trihydrate Na_{2}B_{4}O_{5}(OH)_{4}·3H_{2}O. It is a colorless solid with a density of 1.880 kg/m^{3} that crystallizes from water solutions above 60.8 °C (141.4 °F) in the rhombohedral crystal system. It occurs naturally as the mineral tinkhanite. It can be obtained by heating the "decahydrate" above 61 °C (142 °F). Borax "dihydrate" has the formula Na_{2}B_{4}O_{7}·2H_{2}O, which is actually anhydrous, with the correct formula Na_{2}B_{4}O_{5}(OH)_{4}. It can be obtained by heating the "decahydrate" or "pentahydrate" to above 116–120 °C (241–248 °F). Anhydrous borax is sodium tetraborate proper, with formula Na_{2}B_{4}O_{7}. It can be obtained by heating any hydrate to 300 °C (572 °F). It has one amorphous (glassy) form and three crystalline forms – α, β, and γ, with melting points of 1,015 K (742 °C; 1,367 °F), 993 K (720 °C; 1,328 °F) and 936 K (663 °C; 1,225 °F) respectively. α-Na_{2}B_{4}O_{7} is the stable form.

== Natural sources ==
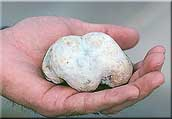
Borax "cottonball", a naturally occurring form of sodium-calcium borate found on the ground surface in Death Valley, California

Borax occurs naturally in evaporite deposits produced by the repeated evaporation of seasonal lakes. The most commercially important deposits are found in: Boron, California; and Searles Lake, California. Also, borax has been found at many other locations in the Southwestern United States, the Atacama Desert in Chile, newly discovered deposits in Bolivia, and in Tibet and Romania. Borax can also be produced synthetically from other boron compounds.

Naturally occurring borax (known by the trade name Rasorite–46 in the United States and many other countries) is refined by a process of recrystallization.

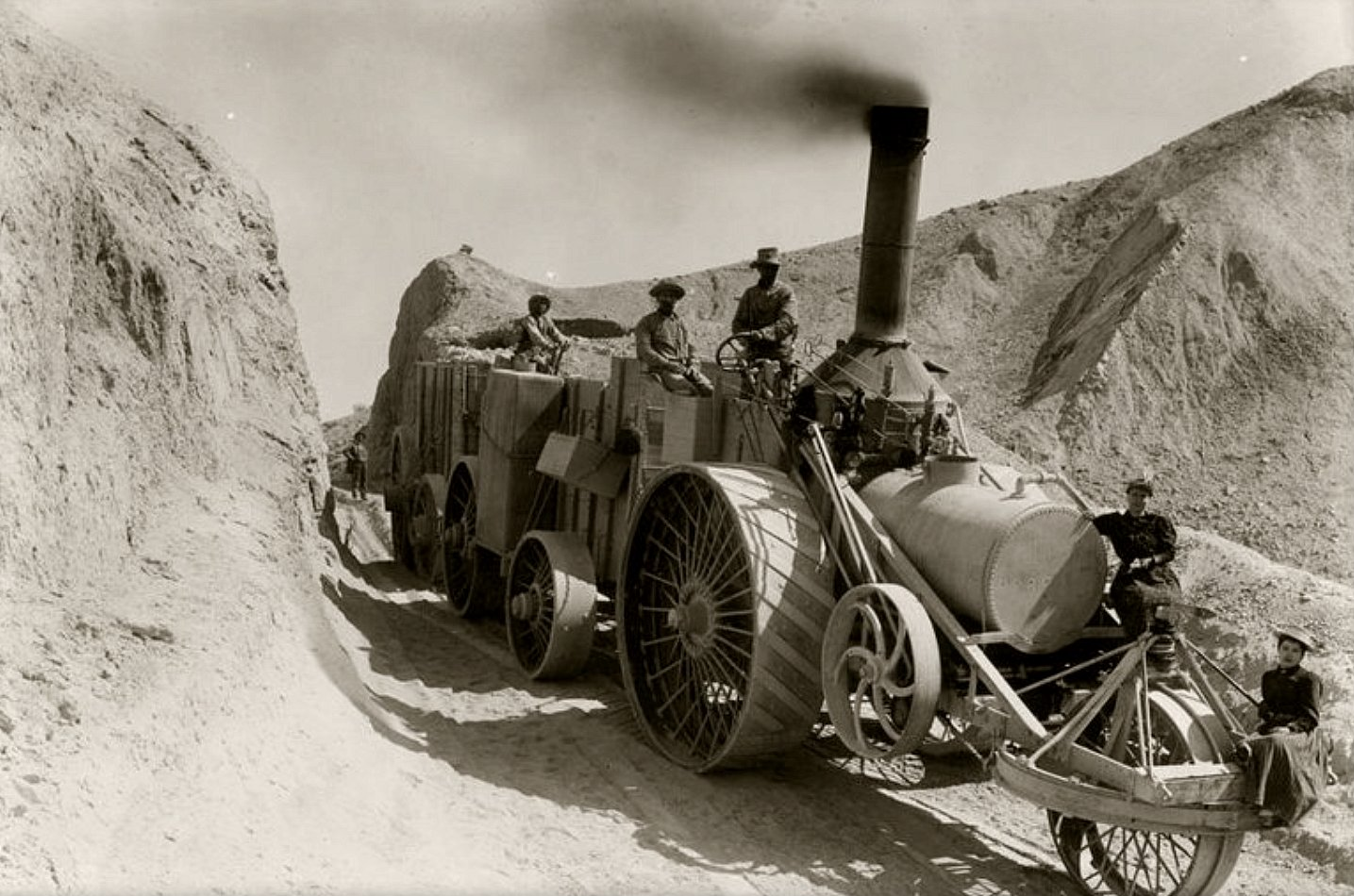
Traction steam engine hauling borax, Death Valley, California 1904

== Uses ==
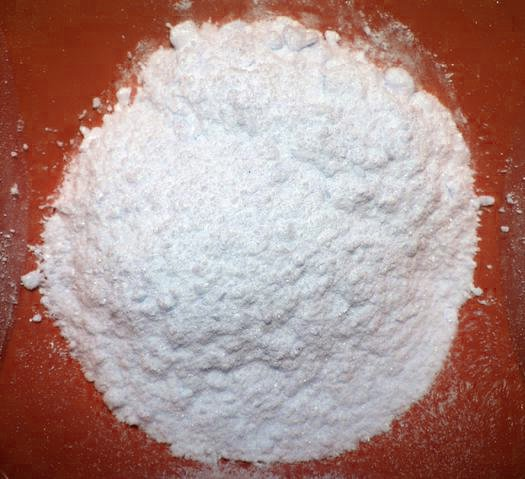
Borax-based laundry detergent

Borax is used in pest control solutions because it is toxic to ants and rats. Because it is slow-acting, worker ants will carry the borax to their nests and poison the rest of the colony. Borax is more effective than zinc borate for termite control, but a 1997 paper concluded that exposing at least 10% of the total colony population was needed for effective treatment. In Japan the practice of laying newspapers treated with o-boric acid and borax under buildings has been effective in controlling Coptotermes formosanus and Reticulitermes speratus populations. Decaying wood treated with 0.25 to 0.5 percent DOT was also found to be effective for baiting Heterotermes aureus populations. The paper concluded: "Borate baits would undoubtably be helpful in the long-term, but do not appear sufficient as a sole method of structural protection."

Borax is used in various household laundry and cleaning products, including the 20 Mule Team Borax laundry booster, Boraxo powdered hand soap, and some tooth bleaching formulas. Borax acts as an effective natural fungicide and wood preservative and inhibits mould growth.

Borate ions (commonly supplied as boric acid) are used in biochemical and chemical laboratories to make buffers, e.g. for polyacrylamide gel electrophoresis of DNA and RNA, such as TBE buffer (borate buffered tris-hydroxymethylaminomethonium) or the newer SB buffer or BBS buffer (borate-buffered saline) in coating procedures. Borate buffers (usually at pH 8) are also used as preferential equilibration solutions in dimethyl pimelimidate (DMP) based crosslinking reactions.

Borax as a source of borate has been used to take advantage of the co-complexing ability of borate with other agents in water to form complex ions with various substances. Borate and a suitable polymer bed are used to chromatograph non-glycated hemoglobin differentially from glycated hemoglobin (chiefly HbA1c), which is an indicator of long-term hyperglycemia in diabetes mellitus.

Borax alone does not have a high affinity for hardness cations, although it has been used for water softening. A general chemical equation for water softening is

R^{2+}(aq) + Na_{2}B_{4}O_{7}(aq) → RB_{4}O_{7}(s)↓ + 2 Na^{+}(aq)

(R is the dissolved cation, usually calcium or magnesium). The sodium ions introduced do not make water "hard". This method is suitable for removing both temporary and permanent types of hardness.

A mixture of borax and ammonium chloride is used as a flux when welding iron and steel. It lowers the melting point of the unwanted iron oxide (scale), allowing it to run off. Borax is also mixed with water as a flux when soldering jewelry metals such as gold or silver, where it allows the molten solder to wet the metal and flow evenly into the joint. Borax is also a flux for "pre-tinning" tungsten with zinc, making the tungsten soft-solderable. Borax is often used as a flux for forge welding.

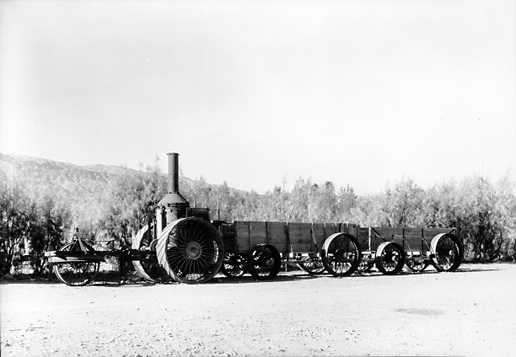
Old steam tractor with borax wagons, Death Valley National Park

In artisanal gold mining, borax is sometimes used as part of a process known as the borax method (as a flux) meant to eliminate the need for toxic mercury in the gold extraction process, although it cannot directly replace mercury. Borax was reportedly used by gold miners in parts of the Philippines in the 1900s. There is evidence that, in addition to reducing the environmental impact, this method achieves better gold recovery for suitable ores and is less expensive. This borax method is used in northern Luzon in the Philippines, but miners have been reluctant to adopt it elsewhere for reasons that are not well understood. The method has also been promoted in Bolivia and Tanzania.

A rubbery polymer sometimes called Slime, Flubber, "gluep" or "glurch" (or erroneously called Silly Putty, which is based on silicone polymers), can be made by cross-linking polyvinyl alcohol with borax. Making flubber from polyvinyl acetate-based glues, such as Elmer's Glue, and borax is a common elementary science demonstration.

Borax, given the E number E285, is used as a food additive, but this use is banned in some countries, such as Australia, China, Thailand and the United States. As a consequence, certain foods, such as caviar, produced for sale in the United States contain higher levels of salt to assist preservation. In addition to its use as a preservative, borax imparts a firm, rubbery texture to food. In China, borax (Chinese: 硼砂; pinyin: péng shā or Chinese: 月石; pinyin: yuè shí) has been found in foods including wheat and rice noodles named lamian (Chinese: 拉面; pinyin: lāmiàn), shahe fen (Chinese: 沙河粉; pinyin: shāhéfěn), char kway teow (Chinese: 粿條; pinyin: guǒ tiáo), and chee cheong fun (Chinese: 肠粉; pinyin: chángfěn). In Indonesia, it is a common, but forbidden, additive to such foods as noodles, bakso (meatballs), and steamed rice.

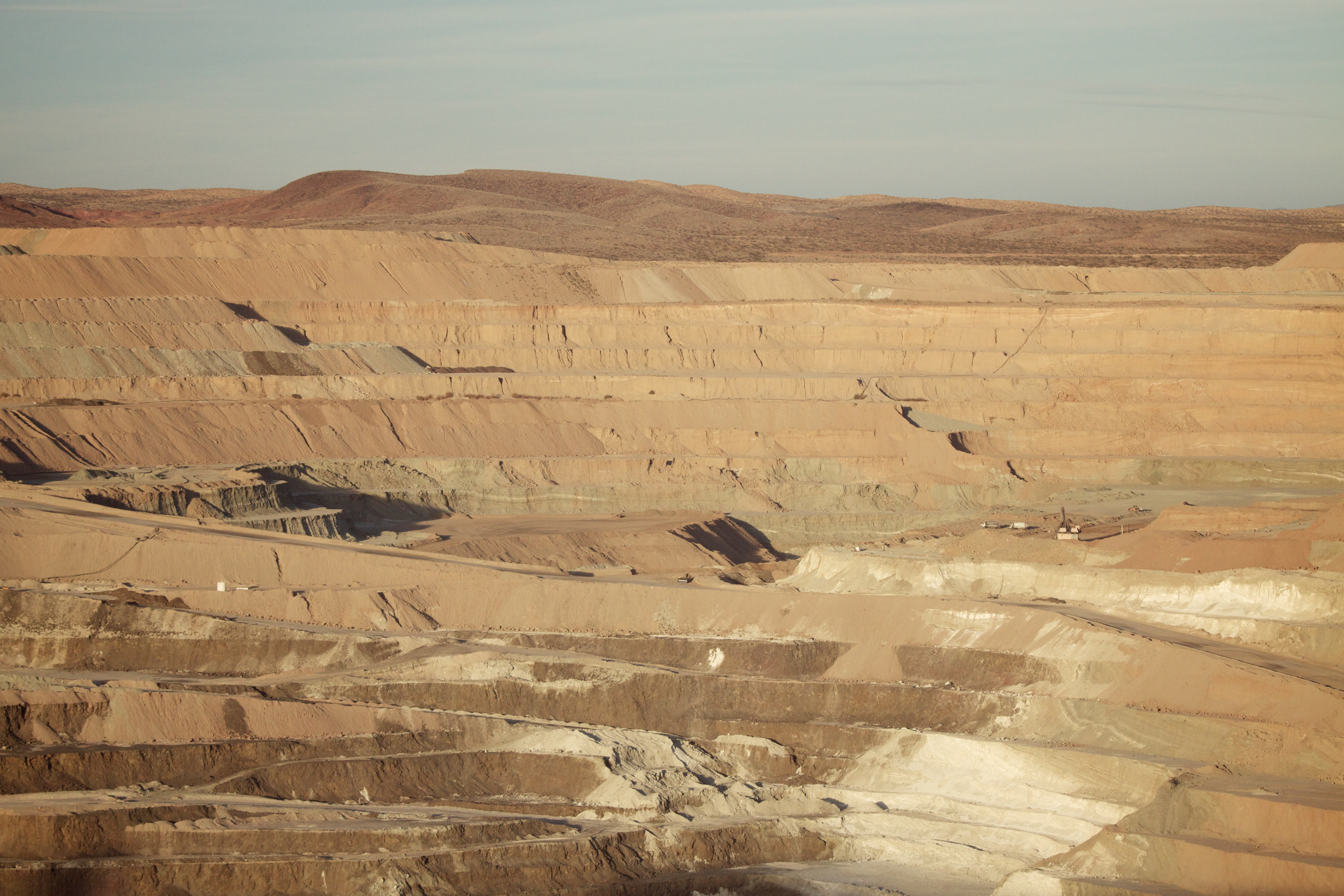
Rio Tinto borax mine pit, Boron, California

=== Other uses ===
Other uses include:

- Ingredient in enamel glazes.
- Component of glass, pottery, and ceramics.
- Used as an additive in ceramic slips and ceramic glazes to improve fit on wet, greenware, and bisque.
- Flame retardant treatment for fabric.
- Anti-fungal compound for cellulose insulation.
- Mothproofing 10% solution for wool.
- Pulverized for the prevention of stubborn pests (e.g. German cockroaches) in closets, pipe and cable inlets, wall panelling gaps, and inaccessible locations where ordinary pesticides are undesirable.
- Tackifier ingredient in casein, starch and dextrin-based adhesives.
- To make indelible ink for dip pens by dissolving shellac into heated borax.
- Curing agent for snake skins.
- Curing agent for salmon eggs, for use in sport fishing for salmon.
- Swimming pool buffering agent to control pH.
- In nuclear reactors and spent fuel pools as a neutron absorber to control reactivity and to shut down a nuclear chain reaction.
- As a micronutrient fertilizer to correct boron-deficient soils.
- Preservative in taxidermy.
- To color fires with a green tint.
- Traditionally used to coat dry-cured meats such as hams to improve the appearance and discourage flies.
- Used as a flux for melting metals and alloys in casting to draw out impurities and prevent oxidation.
- Used as a woodworm treatment (diluted in water).
- In particle physics as an additive to nuclear emulsion, to extend the latent image lifetime of charged particle tracks. The first observation of the pion, which was awarded the 1950 Nobel Prize, used this type of emulsion.

== Toxicity ==
According to one study, borax is not acutely toxic. Its LD_{50} (median lethal dose) score is tested at 2.66 g/kg in rats, meaning that a significant dose of the chemical is needed to cause severe symptoms or death.

The lethal dose is not necessarily the same for humans; human studies in three borate exposure-rich comparison groups (U.S. Borax mine and production facility workers, Chinese boron workers, Turkish residents living near boron rich regions) produced no indicators of developmental toxicity in blood and semen tests. The highest estimated exposure was 5 mg B/kg/day, likely due to eating in contaminated workplaces, more than 100 times the average daily exposure.

Borax is absorbed poorly through intact skin, although fatalities have been recorded in persistent treatment of rashes and open wounds with boric acid-containing ointments and bath solutions. Borax is readily absorbed orally, well above 90%, and mostly excreted through the urine. Fatal cases attributed to ingestion include small children mistakenly drinking pesticides or suicide attempts with large volumes of crystals. No genotoxicity or carcinogenicity has been recorded in studies.

Borax has been in use as an insecticide in the United States with various restrictions since 1946. All restrictions were removed in February 1986 due to the low toxicity of borax, as reported in two EPA documents relating to boric acid and borax.

EPA has determined that, because they are of low toxicity and occur naturally, boric acid and its sodium salts should be exempted from the requirement of a tolerance (maximum residue limit) for all raw agricultural commodities.

Although it cited inconclusive data, a re-evaluation in 2006 by the EPA still found that "There were no signs of toxicity observed during the study and no evidence of cytotoxicity to the target organ." In the reevaluation, a study of toxicity due to overexposure was checked and the findings were that "The residential handler inhalation risks due to boric acid and its sodium salts as active ingredients are not a risk concern and do not exceed the level of concern", but that there could be some risk of irritation to children inhaling it if used as a powder for cleaning rugs.

Overexposure to borax dust can cause respiratory irritation, while no skin irritation is known to exist due to external borax exposure. Ingestion may cause gastrointestinal distress including nausea, persistent vomiting, abdominal pain, and diarrhea. Effects on the vascular system and human brain include headaches and lethargy but are less frequent. In severe cases, a "beefy" red rash affecting the palms, soles, buttocks and scrotum has occurred.

Borax was added to the Substance of Very High Concern (SVHC) candidate list on December 16, 2010. The SVHC candidate list is part of the EU Regulations on the Registration, Evaluation, Authorisation and Restriction of Chemicals 2006 (REACH), and the addition was based on the revised classification of borax as toxic for reproduction category 1B under the CLP Regulations. Substances and mixtures imported into the EU which contain borax are now required to be labelled with the warnings "May damage fertility" and "May damage the unborn child". It was proposed for addition to REACH Annex XIV by the ECHA on July 1, 2015. If this recommendation is approved, all imports and uses of borax in the EU will have to be authorized by the ECHA.

A review of the boron toxicity (as boric acid and borates) published in 2012 in the Journal of Toxicology and Environmental Health concluded: "It clearly appears that human B [boron] exposures, even in the highest exposed cohorts, are too low to reach the blood (and target tissue) concentrations that would be required to exert adverse effects on reproductive functions." A draft risk assessment released by Health Canada in July 2016 has found that overexposure to boric acid has the potential to cause developmental and reproductive health effects. Since people are already exposed to boric acid naturally through their diets and water, Health Canada advised that exposure from other sources should be reduced as much as possible, especially for children and pregnant women.

The concern is not with any one product, but rather multiple exposures from a variety of sources. With this in mind, the department also announced that certain pesticides that contain boric acid, which are commonly used in homes, will have their registrations cancelled and be phased out of the marketplace. As well, new, more protective label directions are being introduced for other boric acid pesticides that continue to be registered in Canada (for example, enclosed bait stations and spot treatments using gel formulations).

== See also ==
- Borax bead test
- John Veatch
- List of cleaning agents
- Sodium borohydride
- Ulexite
