= Slime (toy) =

Viscous material marketed as a toy by Mattel since 1976

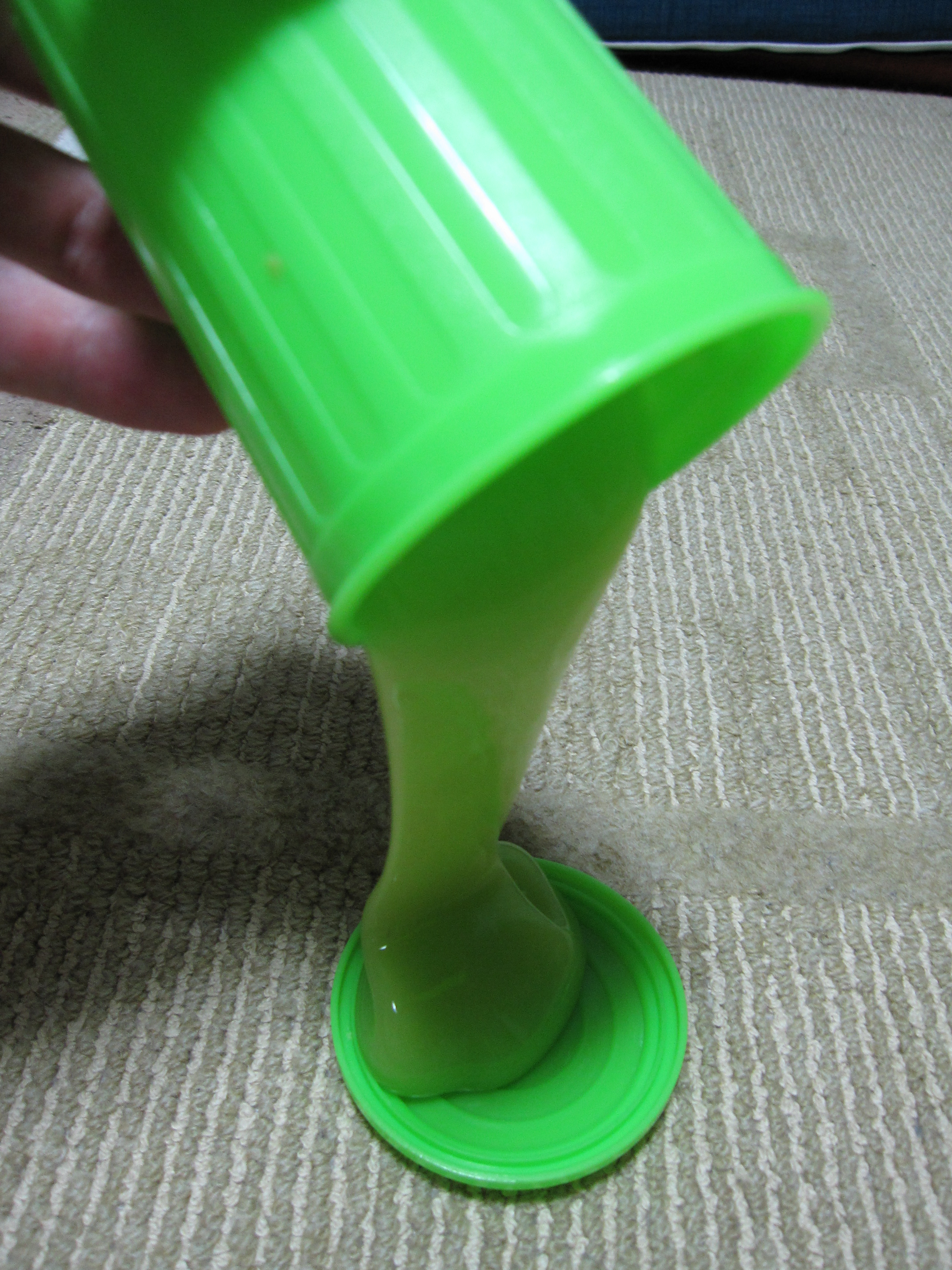
- Type: Novelty toy and stress toy
- Company: Mattel
- Country: United States
- Availability: 1976–present
- Materials: Guar gum, PVA glue
- Slogan: Gooey, drippy, oozy, cold 'n clammy

Slime is a toy product manufactured by Mattel, sold in a plastic trash can and introduced in February 1976. It consists of a non-toxic viscous, squishy and oozy green or other color material made primarily from guar gum. Different variations of Slime have been released over the years, including Slime containing rubber insects, eyeballs, and worms.

The late 1970s also introduced a Slime Monster board game; the object of the game is for the player to avoid having their game piece slimed on by a foot-tall plastic monster with slime oozing from its mouth. Other toy companies have produced their own slime, such as Hordak's Slime Pit playset as part of the Masters of the Universe toys in the 1980s and Ecto-Plazm play gel sold with selected figures in Kenner's Real Ghostbusters toy line. Playmates Toys' Teenage Mutant Ninja Turtles figure line introduced a Retro-mutagen slime sold in containers and included with playsets.

While the substance is non-toxic, it is extremely difficult to remove from soft furnishings.

== Chemical components ==
The main components are the polysaccharide guar gum, and sodium tetraborate. As an alternative to the polysaccharide, other alcohol-group containing polymers (such as polyvinyl alcohol) may be used to a similar result. These non-polysaccharide polymer products are more often referred to as flubber. Due to its ingredients, leaving the slime outside its container could cause the slime to dry or get stuck in fabric or one's hair.

== Cultural impact ==
Slime has expanded into other franchises such as Masters of the Universe, Teenage Mutant Ninja Turtles, and Ghostbusters. The Masters of the Universe slime features Hordak, an antagonist from the series. Created by Kenner, Ghostbusters slime has different colors of slime due to the added food coloring, and it has been featured in action toys and a playset. For the Teenage Mutant Ninja Turtles, the slime is called Retromutagen Ooze, a reference to how the turtles were made. The slimes were later added to toy sets. The Teenage Mutant Ninja Turtles slime line is made by Playmate. Slime use has expanded to various Nickelodeon game shows, including Super Sloppy, Double Dare and the Nickelodeon Kids' Choice Awards, though the composition and history differs from that of the toy slime.

In 2025, slime was inducted into the National Toy Hall of Fame at The Strong National Museum of Play.

== See also ==
- Flubber (material), rubbery polymer commonly called slime
- Gunge
- Silly Putty, another jelly substance obtained from cross-linking polyvinyl alcohol chains with borate anions
