= Rhoecus (mythology) =

Men in Greek mythology

In ancient Greek mythology, Rhoecus (Ancient Greek: Ῥοῖκος, romanized: Rhoîkos) can refer to the following personages:

- Rhoecus, a rich man from the Greek city of Cnidus who once saved a nymph and her tree from certain doom, but later lost the nymph's favour after disrespecting her bee messenger.
- Rhoecus, a centaur who along with his friend Hylaeus harassed the huntress Atalanta and insulted her archery skills. Atalanta killed them both with her arrows. In one version, they made an attempt on her at night, wielding makeshift pine torches that set fires to the woods she dwelled in.

== Bibliography ==
- Aelian, Various Histories, translated by Thomas Stanley (d.1700) edition of 1665, a text in the public domain, nobly digitized by the University of Chicago. Available online on Topos Text.
- Apollodorus, The Library, with an English Translation by Sir James George Frazer, F.B.A., F.R.S. in 2 Volumes. Cambridge, MA, Harvard University Press; London, William Heinemann Ltd. 1921. Online version at the Perseus Digital Library.
- Callimachus, Hymns in Callimachus and Lycophron with an English translation by A. W. Mair; Aratus, with an English translation by G. R. Mair, London: W. Heinemann, New York: G. P. Putnam 1921 . Available online on the Internet Archive.
- Etymologicum Magnum, edited by Friedrich Sylburg. Lipsiae: Apud J.A.G. Weigel. 1816. Online text available at the Internet Archive.
- Wendel, Carl (1914). Scholia in Theocritum vetera. Leipzig: B. G. Teubner.
