= Borax (mineral) =

Borate mineral

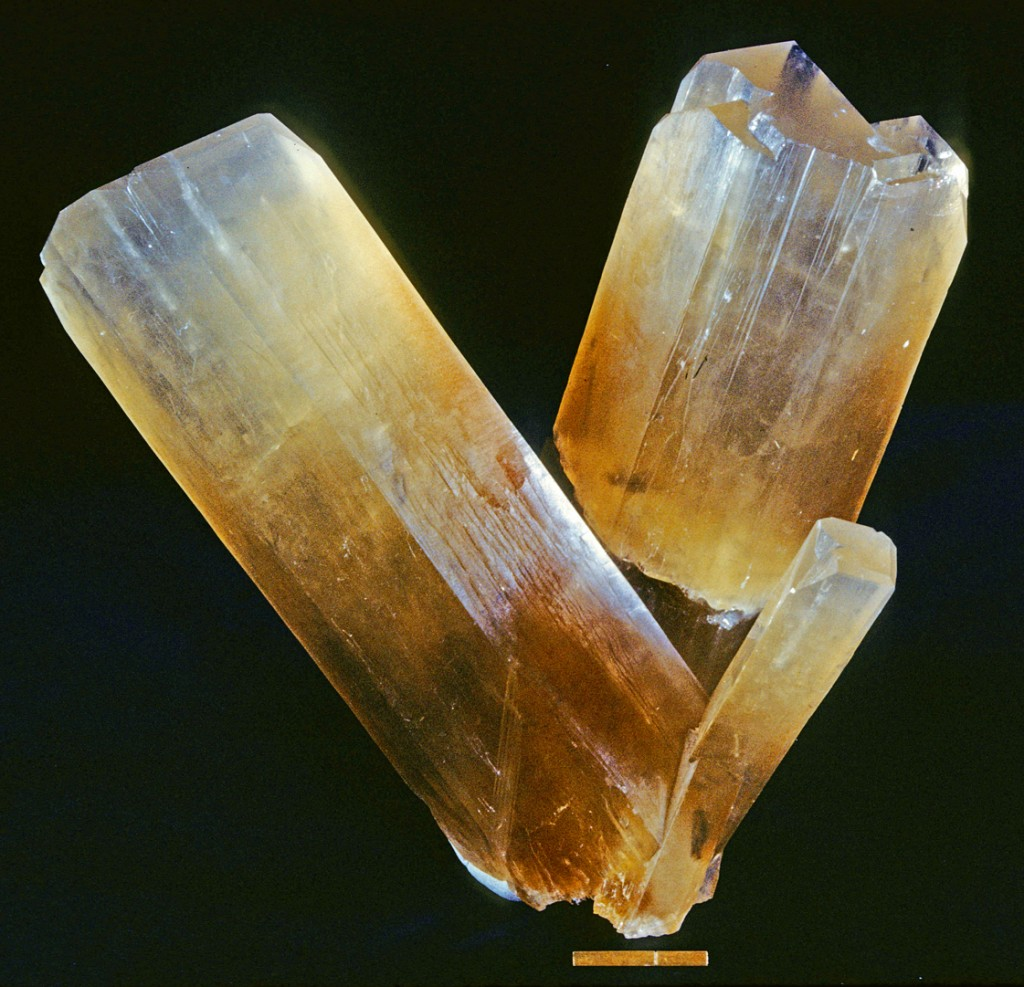
- Borax from the Kramer Borate deposit, Boron, Kern Co, California, USA

General
- Category: Nesoborate
- Formula: Na_{2}B_{4}O_{5}(OH)_{4}·8H_{2}O
- IMA symbol: Brx
- Strunz classification: 6.DA.10
- Crystal system: Monoclinic
- Crystal class: Prismatic (2/m) (same H-M symbol)
- Space group: C2/c (no. 15)
- Unit cell: a = 11.8790(2) Å, b = 10.6440(2) Å, c = 12.2012(2) Å; β = 106.617(1)°; Z = 4

Identification
- Color: Colorless or white
- Crystal habit: As prismatic crystals or as massive encrustations
- Twinning: Rare on {100}
- Cleavage: Perfect on {100}, less perfect on {100}, very poor on {010}
- Fracture: Conchoidal
- Mohs scale hardness: 2 to 2.5
- Luster: Vitreous to resinous to earthy
- Streak: White
- Diaphaneity: Translucent to opaque
- Specific gravity: 1.715
- Optical properties: Biaxial (-)
- Refractive index: nα = 1.4466 nβ = 1.4687 nγ = 1.4717
- Fusibility: 1.5
- Diagnostic features: Froths on heating, producing a yellow flame
- Solubility: Soluble in water

Borax (Na_{2}B_{4}O_{5}(OH)_{4} · 8 H_{2}O) is a borate mineral found in evaporite deposits of alkaline lacustrine environments and as a surface efflorescence in arid regions. It is the chief mineral mined from the deposits at Boron, California and nearby locations, and is the chief source of commercial borax.

Borax first reached Western civilization as tincal mined from deposits in Tibet. The term borax comes from the Arabic bauraq, meaning white.

== Occurrences ==
The most extensive deposits are in Kirka, Turkey. Borax is also mined in the Andes Mountains of Argentina, Bolivia, and Chile. However, the greatest production is from the deposits in California.

== Uses ==
Natural occurrences of the mineral are an important source of commercial borax, which is used for the manufacture of glass fibers, in cleaning agents, as an antiseptic, and as a flux in metallurgy and solvent for metal oxides.

== See also ==
- List of minerals
