= Harpalus (son of Polemaeus) =

Harpalus son of Polemaeus from Beroea, was a Macedonian statesman, hieromnemon at Delphi and the chief of the ambassadors sent by Perseus to Rome in 172 BC, to answer the complaints of Eumenes II, king of Pergamon. Harpalus gave great offence to the Romans by the haughty and vehement tone that he assumed, and exacerbated the irritation already existing against Perseus.
