= Dimethyl pimelimidate =

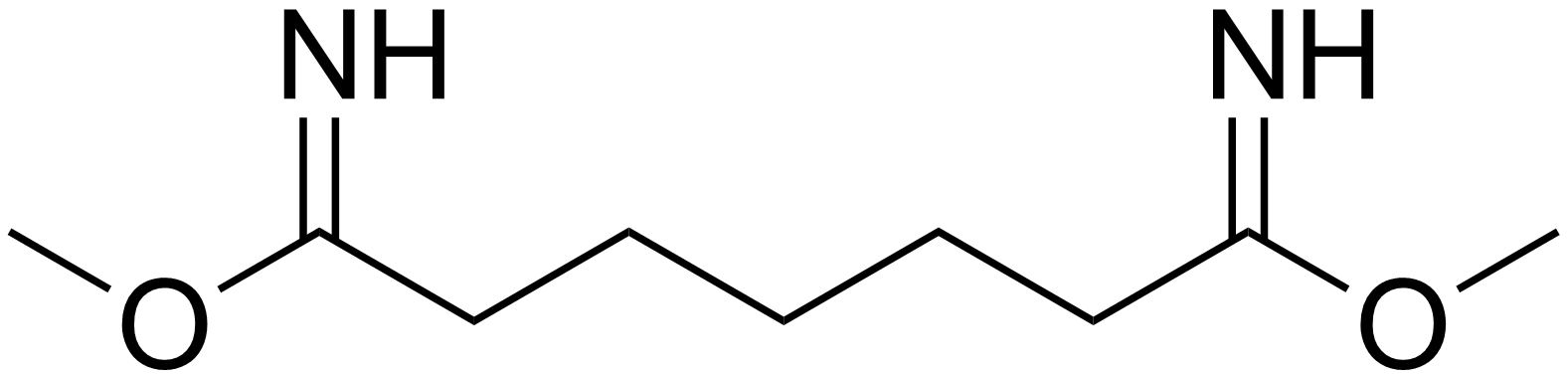

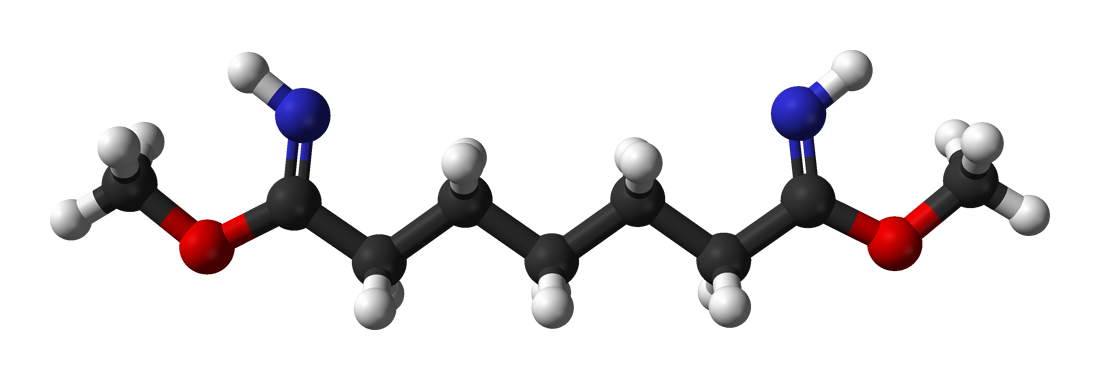

Names
- Preferred IUPAC name Dimethyl heptanediimidate
- Other names Pimelimidic acid dimethyl ester dihydrochloride, dimethyl heptane-1,7-diimidate dihydrochloride

Identifiers
| CAS Number | 36875-25-9; 58537-94-3 (dihydrochloride) |
| 3D model (JSmol) | Interactive image |
| ChemSpider | 16742681 |
| EC Number | 261-320-6 |
| PubChem CID | 65403 |
| UNII | L9U23Y3EV3 |
| CompTox Dashboard (EPA) | DTXSID80905140 |
- InChI: InChI=1S/C9H18N2O2/c1-12-8(10)6-4-3-5-7-9(11)13-2/h10-11H,3-7H2,1-2H3 Key: LRPQMNYCTSPGCX-UHFFFAOYSA-N
- SMILES: COC(=N)CCCCCC(=N)OC

Properties
| Chemical formula | C_{9}H_{18}N_{2}O_{2} |
| Molar mass | 186.255 g·mol^{−1} |
| Appearance | White crystalline powder (dihydrochloride) |
| Melting point | 122 °C (252 °F; 395 K) dihydrochloride |
| Solubility in water | Slightly soluble (dihydrochloride) |

Hazards
- GHS labelling
| Pictograms | (GHS07: Exclamation mark) |
| Signal word | Warning |
| Hazard statements | H315 |
| Precautionary statements | P264, P280, P302+P352, P321, P332+P317, P362+P364 |
| NFPA 704 (fire diamond) | 1 1 0 |
| Flash point | Not determined |
- Except where otherwise noted, data are given for materials in their standard state (at 25 °C [77 °F], 100 kPa). Infobox references

Dimethyl pimelimidate (DMP) is an organic chemical compound with two functional imidate groups. It is usually available as the more stable dihydrochloride salt. It binds free amino groups at pH range 7.0-10.0 to form amidine bonds.

== Uses ==
DMP is used mainly as bifunctional coupling reagent to link proteins. It is often used to prepare antibody affinity columns. The appropriate antibody is first incubated with Protein A or Protein G-agarose and allowed to bind. DMP is then added to couple the molecules together.

== Health effects ==
DMP is irritating to the eyes, skin, mucous membranes and upper respiratory tract. It can exert harmful effects by inhalation, ingestion, or skin absorption.
