= Amarynthus =

Ancient Greek mythological figure

In Greek mythology, Amarynthus (Ancient Greek: Ἀμάρυνθος, romanized: Amárunthos) is a hunter of Artemis, from whom the town of Amarynthus in Euboea, a large island off the coast of Greece, was believed to have derived its name.

== Mythology ==
According to Stephanus of Byzantium, an island of Euboea was named Amarynthus after this Amarynthus, a hunter of Artemis. Strabo mentions a Euboean town also called Amarynthus, in which stood the sanctuary of Artemis Amarynthia. Artemis derived the epithet Amarynthia or Amarysia from this hero—or rather from the town of Amarynthus where Amarysia was revered—under which she was worshipped there and in Attica.

== See also ==
- Rhodopis and Euthynicus
- Siproites
- Side
