= Hylaeus =

Hylaeus may refer to:

- Hylaeus, a centaur killed by Atalanta in Greek mythology
- Hylaeus, one of the dogs that tore apart Actaeon
- Hylaeus (bee), a genus of bee
