= Silly Putty =

Toy putty (slime)

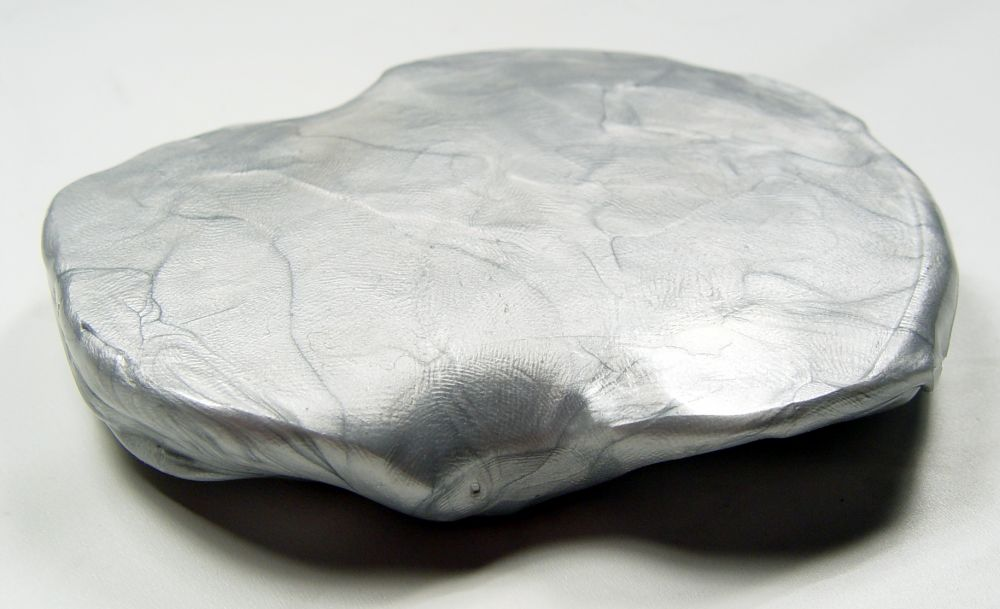
Silver-colored Silly Putty

Silly Putty is a toy containing silicone polymers that has unusual physical properties. It can flow like a liquid, bounce and can be stretched or broken depending on the amount of physical stress to which it is subjected. It contains viscoelastic liquid silicones, a type of non-Newtonian fluid, which makes it act as a viscous liquid over a long period of time but as an elastic solid over a short time period. It was originally created during research into a potential rubber substitute for use by the United States in World War II.

The name Silly Putty is a trademark of Crayola LLC. Other names are used to market similar substances from other manufacturers.

== Description ==
Video showing Silly Putty bouncing

As a bouncing putty, Silly Putty is noted for its unusual characteristics. It bounces when dropped from a height, but breaks when struck or stretched sharply; it can also float in a liquid and will form a puddle given enough time. Silly Putty and most other retail putty products have viscoelastic agents added to reduce the flow and enable the putty to hold its shape.

The original coral-colored Silly Putty is composed of 65% dimethylsiloxane (hydroxy-terminated polymers with boric acid), 17% silica (crystalline quartz), 9% Thixatrol ST (castor oil derivative), 4% polydimethylsiloxane, 1% decamethyl cyclopentasiloxane, 1% glycerine, and 1% titanium dioxide.

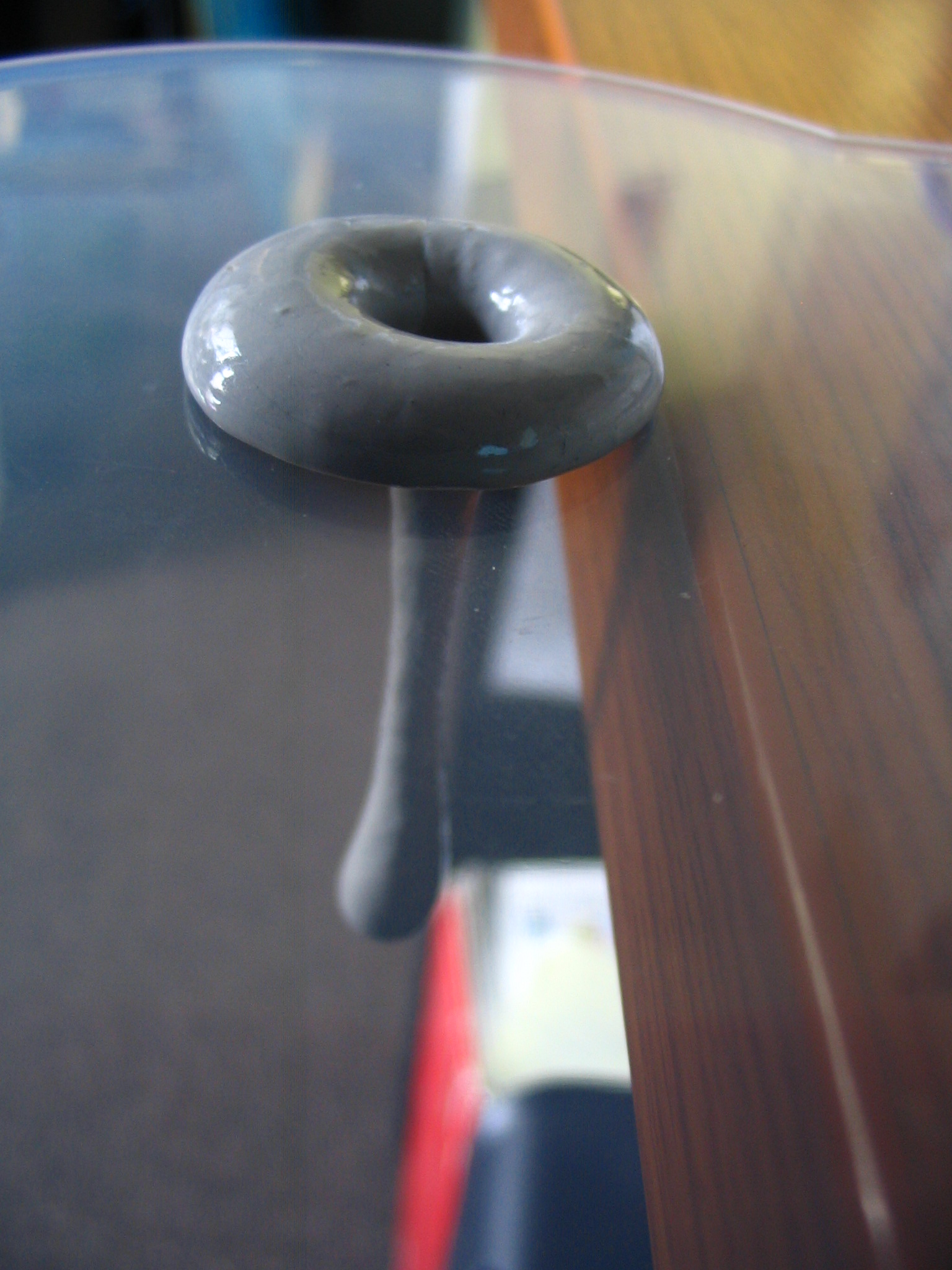
Silly Putty flowing through a hole

Silly Putty's unusual flow characteristics are due to the ingredient polydimethylsiloxane (PDMS), a viscoelastic substance. Viscoelasticity is a type of non-Newtonian flow, characterizing a material that acts as a viscous liquid over a long time period but as an elastic solid over a short time period. Because its apparent viscosity increases directly with respect to the amount of force applied, Silly Putty can be characterized as a dilatant fluid.

Silly Putty is also a fairly good adhesive. When newspaper ink was petroleum based, Silly Putty could be used to transfer newspaper images to other surfaces, providing amusement by distorting the transferred image afterwards. Newer papers with soy-based inks are more resistant to this process.

Generally, Silly Putty is difficult to remove from textured items such as dirt and clothing. Hand sanitizers containing alcohol are often helpful. Silly Putty will dissolve when in contact with an alcohol; after the alcohol evaporates, the material will not exhibit its original properties.

If Silly Putty is submerged in warm or hot water, it will become softer and thus "melt" much faster. It also becomes harder to remove small amounts of it from surfaces. After a long period of time, it will return to its original viscosity.

Silly Putty is sold as a 13 g (0.46 oz) piece of clay inside an egg-shaped plastic container. The Silly Putty brand is owned by Crayola LLC (formerly the Binney & Smith company). As of July 2009, twenty thousand eggs of Silly Putty were sold daily. Since 1950, more than 300 million eggs of Silly Putty (approximately 4,500 short tons or 4,100 tonnes) have been sold. It is available in various colors, including glow-in-the-dark and metallic. Other brands offer similar materials, sometimes in larger-sized containers, and in a similarly wide variety of colors or with different properties, such as magnetism and iridescence.

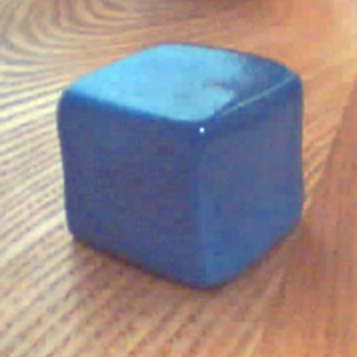
Silly Putty in the form of a solid cube

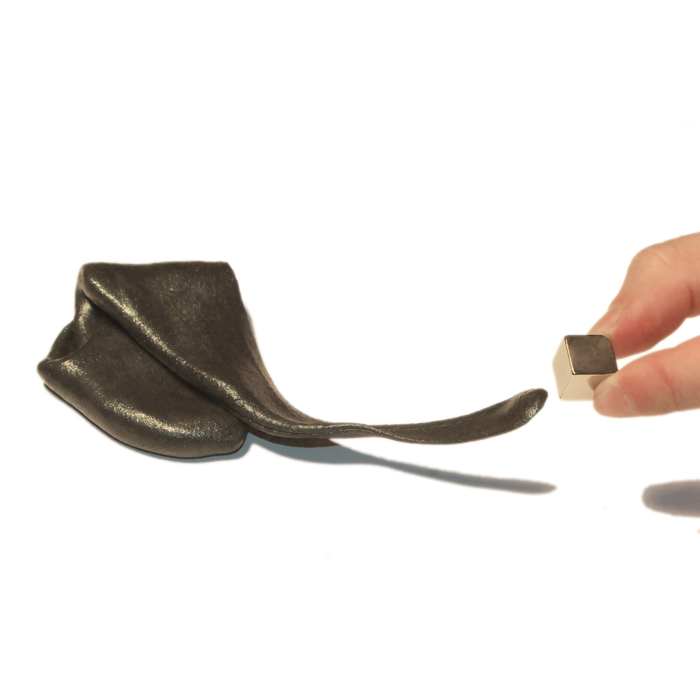
Magnetic Silly Putty

== History ==
During World War II, Japan invaded rubber-producing countries as it expanded its sphere of influence in the Pacific Rim. Rubber was vital for the production of rafts, tires, vehicle and aircraft parts, gas masks, and boots. In the US, all rubber products were rationed; citizens were encouraged to make their rubber products last until the end of the war and to donate spare tires, boots, and coats. Meanwhile, the government funded research into synthetic rubber compounds to attempt to solve this shortage.

Credit for the invention of Silly Putty is disputed and has been attributed variously to Earl Warrick of the then newly formed Dow Corning; Harvey Chin; and James Wright, a Scottish-born inventor working for General Electric in New Haven, Connecticut. Throughout his life, Warrick insisted that he and his colleague, Rob Roy McGregor, received the patent for Silly Putty before Wright did; but Crayola's history of Silly Putty states that Wright first invented it in 1943. Both researchers independently discovered that reacting boric acid with silicone oil would produce a gooey, bouncy material with several unique properties. The non-toxic putty would bounce when dropped, could stretch farther than regular rubber, would not go moldy, and had a very high melting temperature. However, the substance did not have all the properties needed to replace rubber.

In 1949, toy store owner Ruth Fallgatter came across the putty. She contacted marketing consultant Peter C. L. Hodgson (1912–1976). The two decided to market the bouncing putty by selling it in a clear case. Although it sold well, Fallgatter did not pursue it further. However, Hodgson saw its potential.

Already US$12,000 in debt, Hodgson borrowed $147 to buy a batch of the putty to pack 1 oz (28 g) portions into plastic eggs for $1, calling it Silly Putty. Initial sales were poor, but after a New Yorker article mentioned it, Hodgson sold over 250,000 eggs of silly putty in three days. However, Hodgson was almost put out of business in 1951 by the Korean War. Silicone, the main ingredient in silly putty, was put on ration, harming his business. A year later, the restriction on silicone was lifted and the production of Silly Putty resumed. Initially, it was primarily targeted towards adults. However, by 1955, the majority of its customers were aged six to twelve. In 1957, Hodgson produced the first televised commercial for Silly Putty, which aired during the Howdy Doody Show.

In 1961, Silly Putty went worldwide, becoming a hit in the Soviet Union and Europe. In 1968, it was taken into lunar orbit by the Apollo 8 astronauts.

Peter Hodgson died in 1976. A year later, Binney & Smith, the makers of Crayola products, acquired the rights to Silly Putty. As of 2005, annual Silly Putty sales exceeded six million eggs.

Silly Putty was inducted into the National Toy Hall of Fame on May 28, 2001.

== Other uses ==
In addition to its success as a toy, other uses for the putty have been found. In the home, it can be used to remove substances such as dirt, lint, pet hair, and ink from various surfaces. The material's unique properties have found niche use in medical and scientific applications. Occupational therapists use it for rehabilitative therapy of hand injuries. A number of other brands (such as Power Putty and TheraPutty) alter the material's properties, offering different levels of resistance. The material is also used as a tool to help reduce stress, and exists in various viscosities based on the user's preference.

Because of its adhesive characteristics, it was used by Apollo astronauts to secure their tools in zero gravity. Scale model building hobbyists use the putty as a masking medium when spray-painting model assemblies. The Steward Observatory uses a Silly Putty-backed lap to polish astronomical telescope mirrors.

Researchers from Trinity College Dublin School of Physics (Centre for Research on Adaptive Nanostructures and Nanodevices (CRANN) and Advanced Materials and Bioengineering Research (AMBER) Research Centers) have discovered nano composite mixtures of graphene and Silly Putty behave as sensitive pressure sensors, claiming the ability to measure the footsteps of a spider crawling on it.

== See also ==
- Blu Tack
- Flubber (material)
- Slime (toy)
