= Harpalus (engineer) =

Harpalus or Harpalos (Greek: Ἅρπαλος) is a name reported by modern historical books (tertiary sources) as the engineer who built the pontoon bridge over the Hellespont (from Abydos to Sestos) for Xerxes in 480 BC. The primary source Herodotus (7.34-36) gives no specific name, except the following information:

the Phoenicians made a bridge of flaxen cables, and the Egyptians a papyrus one - a great storm swept them down - Xerxes, angry, commanded that the sea receive the punishment of whipping and that the overseers of the bridge be beheaded - and new engineers he set about making the bridges.

The secondary source may have been some later writer, who may have invented a name in order to provide a name for this impressive engineering achievement, in the manner of Mandrocles, recorded by Herodotus as bridging the Bosporus for Darius I. The oldest and relevant source seems to be a work published in 1904 by Hermann Alexander Diels which he titled Laterculi Alexandrini ("Alexandrian lists"), out of a damaged 1st or 2nd-century BC papyrus he found, which lists artists and scientists by their achievements.

The tertiary sources report the following: One of Mandrocles' successors, not named by Herodotus (7.34-36), was Harpalos of Tenedos who, succeeding where Egyptian and Phoenician engineers had failed, built the bridge over the Hellespont (Hofstetter 1978, no. 130; on the bridge, see Hammond and Roseman 1996). It is important for a right estimate of Ionian science to remember the high development of engineering in these days. Mandrokles of Samos built the bridge over the Bosporos for King Dareios (Herod. iv. 88), and Harpalos of Tenedos bridged the Hellespont for Xerxes when the Egyptians and Phoenicians had failed in the attempt (Diels, Laterculi Alexandrini, Abh. der Berl. Akad., 1904, p. 8). Harpalus, a Macedonian contractor, who took on the bridging project, according to Peter Green. The astronomer Harpalus supervised the construction of the bridges. according to Hugh Pembroke Vowles.
