= Harpalus (astronomer) =

Ancient Greek astronomer

- Citizenship: Greek
- Occupation: Ancient Greek astronomer
- Era: 82nd Olympiad (c. 450 BC)
- Known for: Correcting the cycle of Cleostratus; inventor of the Nine Year Cycle
- Notable work: Nine Year Cycle

Harpalus was an ancient Greek astronomer (flourished during the 82nd Olympiad, c. 450 BC) who corrected the cycle of Cleostratus and invented the Nine Year Cycle.

He may also have been the engineer Harpalus, who designed a pontoon bridge solution when Xerxes wished his army to cross the Hellespont.

The lunar crater Harpalus is named for him.
