= Pontoon bridge =

Type of floating bridge

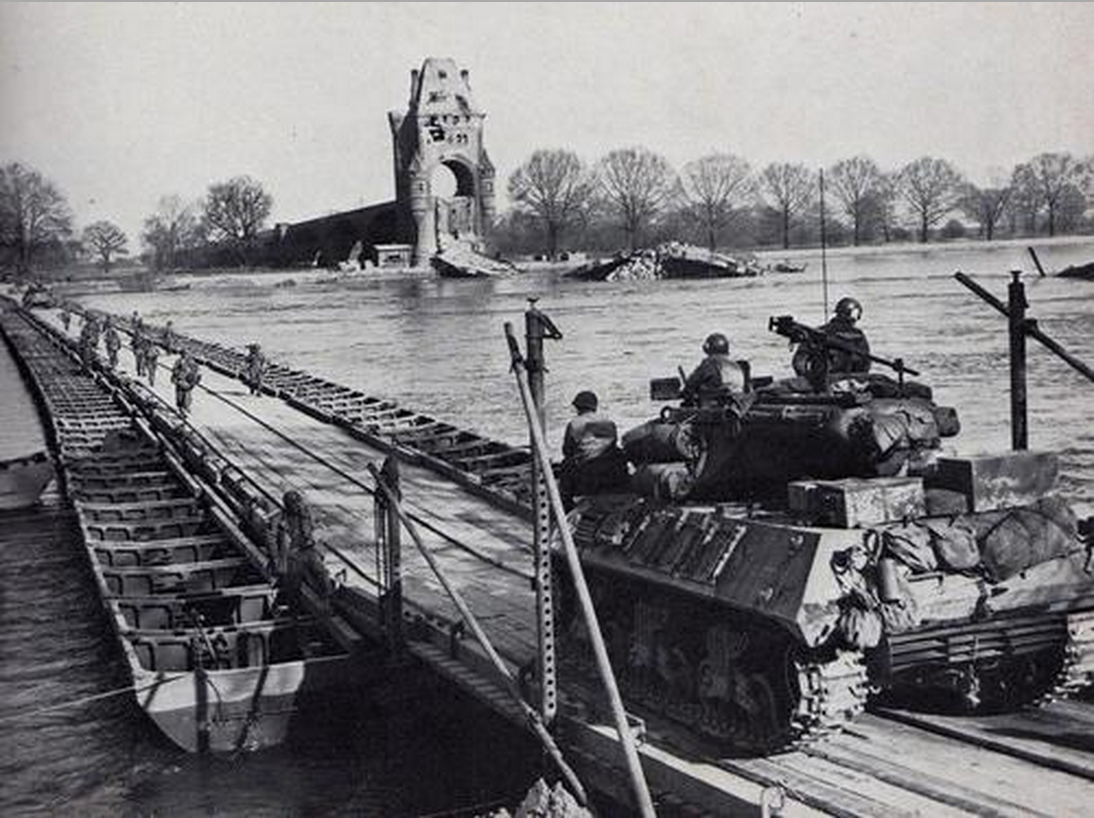
- United States Army troops and an M-36 Tank Destroyer cross the Rhine at Worms on a heavy pontoon bridge, 26 March 1945
- Span range: Short to long
- Material: Various: steel, concrete, boats, barrels, plastic floats, appropriate decking material
- Movable: Generally not, but may have movable sections for watercraft passage
- Design effort: low
- Falsework required: No

A pontoon bridge (or ponton bridge), also known as a floating bridge, is a bridge that uses floats or shallow-draft boats to support a continuous deck for pedestrian and vehicle travel. The buoyancy of the supports limits the maximum load that they can carry.

Most pontoon bridges are temporary and used in wartime and civil emergencies. There are permanent pontoon bridges in civilian use that can carry highway traffic; generally, the relatively high potential for collapse and sinking (e.g. due to waves and collisions) and high continuous maintenance costs makes pontoons unattractive for most civilian construction. Permanent floating bridges are useful for sheltered water crossings if it is not considered economically feasible to suspend a bridge from anchored piers (such as in deep water). Such bridges can require a section that is elevated or can be raised or removed to allow waterborne traffic to pass. Notable permanent pontoon bridges include the Evergreen Point Floating Bridge, Hood Canal Bridge, and the Nordhordland Bridge.

Pontoon bridges have been in use since ancient times and have been used to great advantage in many battles throughout history, such as the Battle of Garigliano, the Battle of Oudenarde, the crossing of the Rhine during World War II, the Yom Kippur War, Operation Badr, the Iran–Iraq War's Operation Dawn 8, and most recently in the Russian invasion of Ukraine.

== Definition ==
A pontoon bridge is a collection of specialized, shallow draft boats or floats, connected together to cross a river or canal, with a track or deck attached on top. The water buoyancy supports the boats, limiting the maximum load to the total and point buoyancy of the pontoons or boats. The supporting boats or floats can be open or closed, temporary or permanent in installation, and made of rubber, metal, wood, or concrete. The decking may be temporary or permanent, and constructed out of wood, modular metal, or asphalt or concrete over a metal frame.

=== Etymology ===
The spelling "ponton" in English dates from at least 1870. The use continued in references found in U.S. patents during the 1890s. It continued to be spelled in that fashion through World War II, when temporary floating bridges were used extensively throughout the European theatre. U.S. combat engineers commonly pronounced the word "ponton" rather than "pontoon" and U.S. military manuals spelled it using a single 'o'. The U.S. military differentiated between the bridge itself ("ponton") and the floats used to provide buoyancy ("pontoon"). The original word was derived from Old French ponton, from Latin ponto ("ferryboat"), from pons ("bridge").

== Design ==
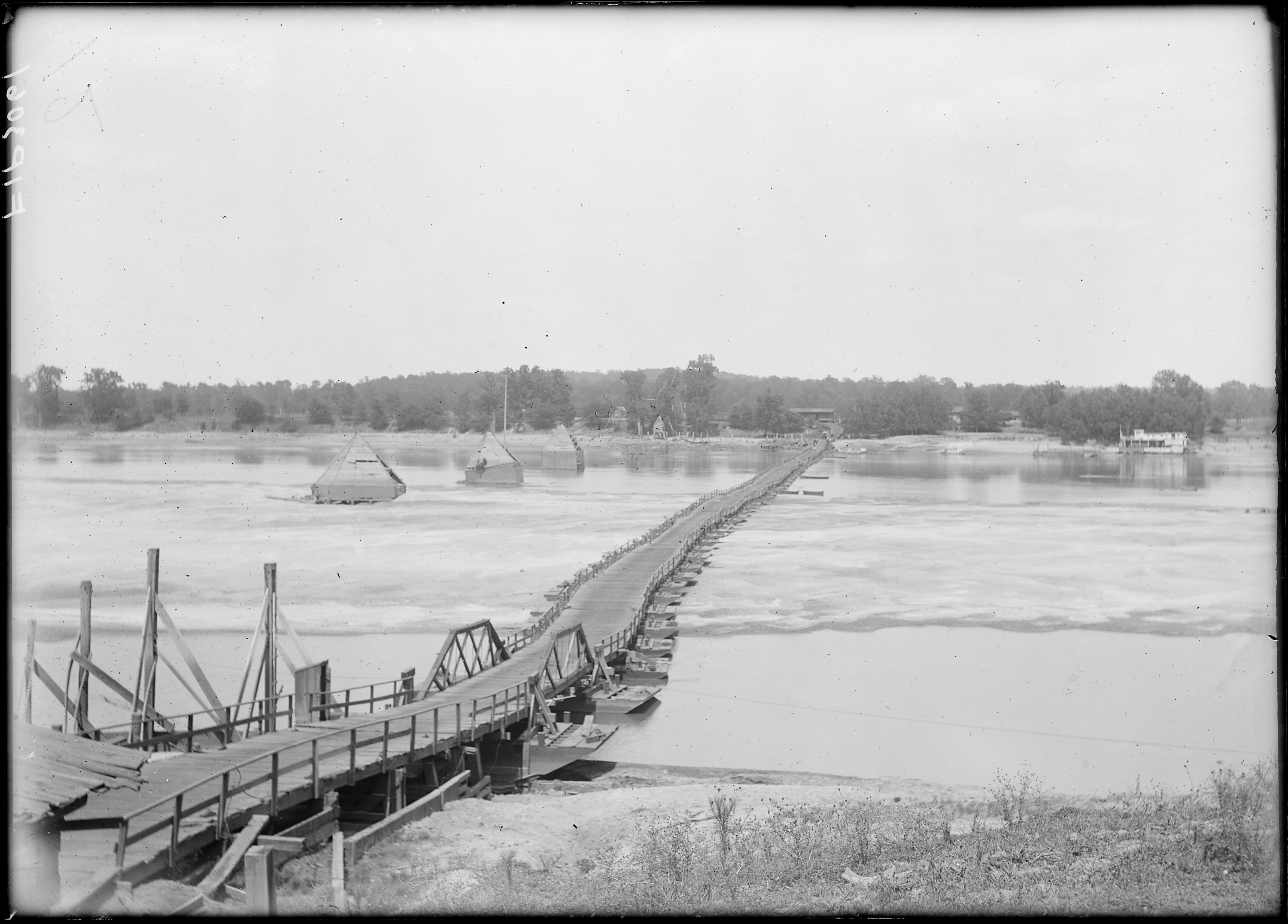
Pontoon bridge between Russellville and Dardanelle, Arkansas, US, at the time reportedly the longest pontoon bridge in the world. (Photo c. 1913–1926)

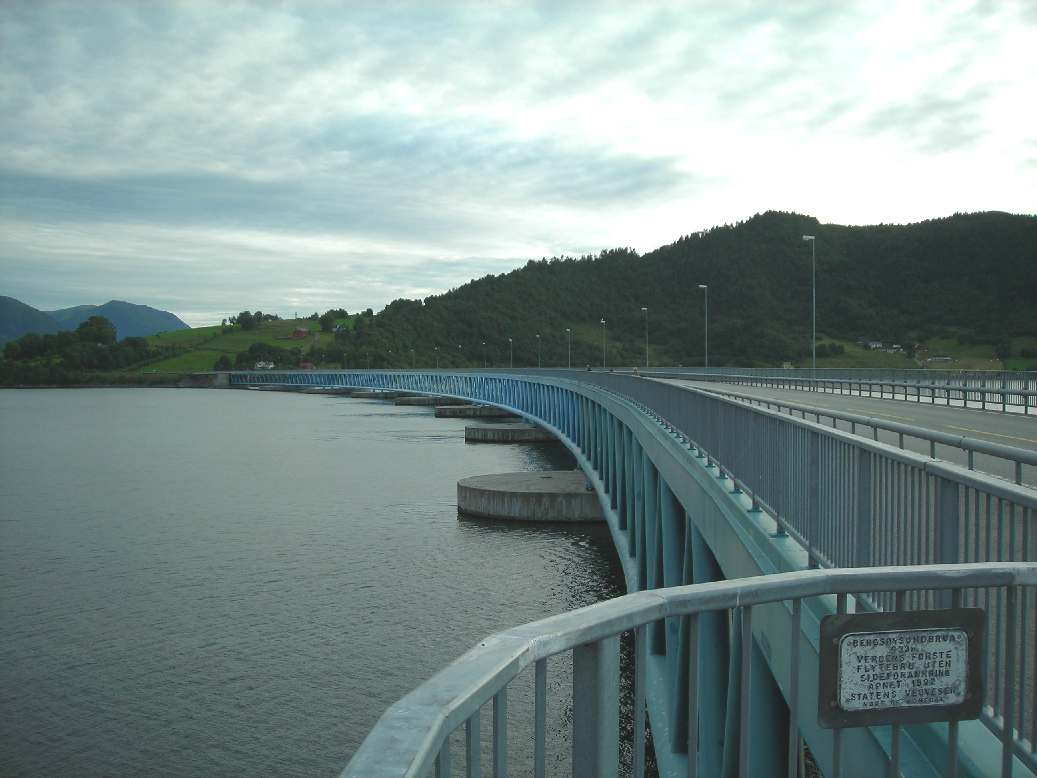
The Bergsøysund Bridge uses concrete pontoons

When designing a pontoon bridge, the civil engineer must take into consideration Archimedes' principle: Each pontoon can support a load equal to the mass of the water that it displaces. This load includes the mass of the bridge and the pontoon itself. If the maximum load of a bridge section is exceeded, one or more pontoons become submerged. Flexible connections have to allow for one section of the bridge to be weighted down more heavily than the other parts. The roadway across the pontoons should be relatively light, so as not to limit the carrying capacity of the pontoons.

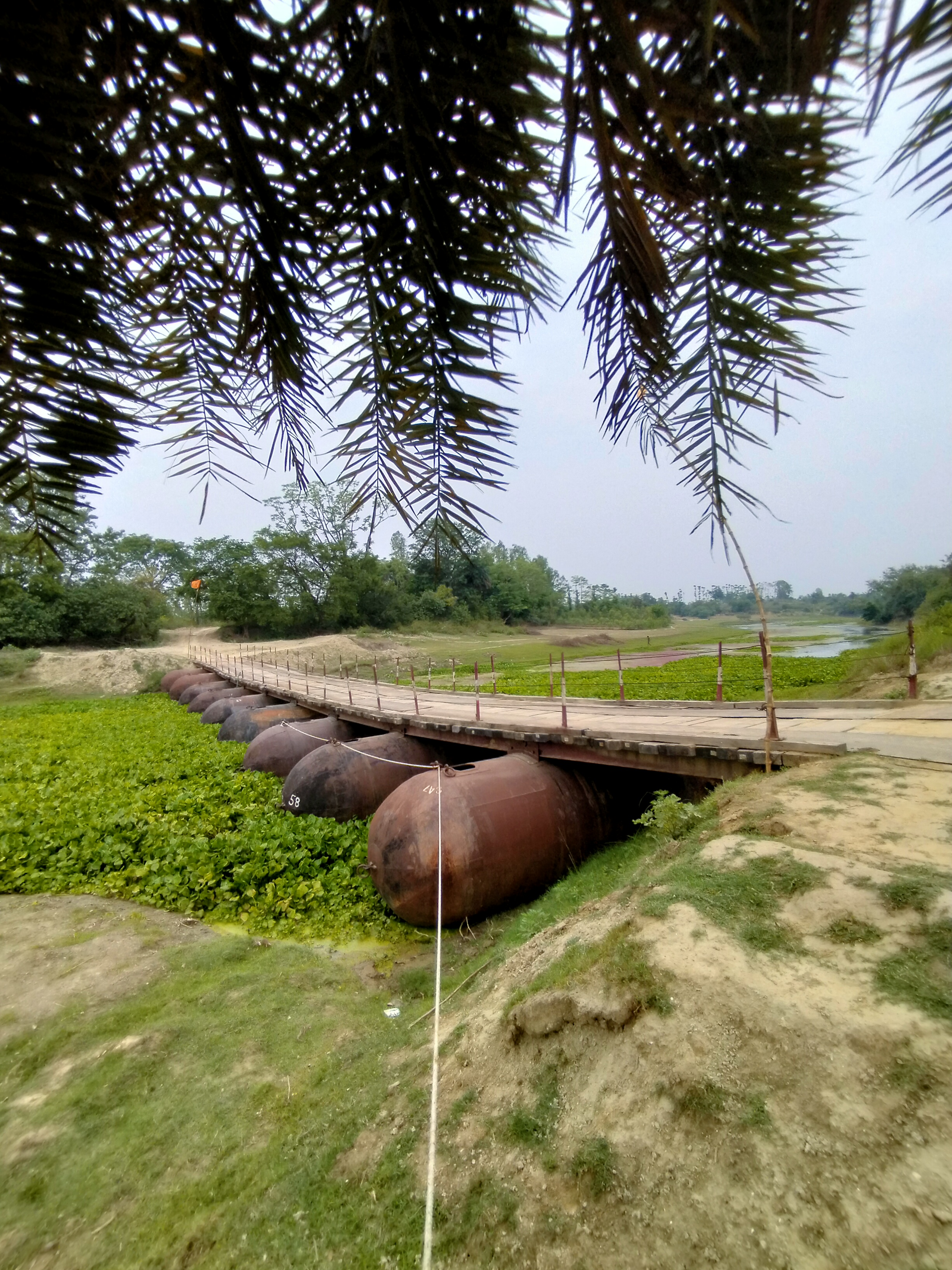
Pantoon Bridge at Indian Village

The connection of the bridge to shore requires the design of approaches that are not too steep, protect the bank from erosion and provide for movements of the bridge during (tidal) changes of the water level.

Floating bridges were historically constructed using wood. Pontoons were formed by simply lashing several barrels together, by rafts of timbers, or by using boats. Each bridge section consisted of one or more pontoons, which were maneuvered into position and then anchored underwater or on land. The pontoons were linked together using wooden stringers called balks. The balks were covered by a series of cross planks called chesses to form the road surface, and the chesses were secured with side guard rails.

A floating bridge can be built in a series of sections, starting from an anchored point on the shore. Modern pontoon bridges usually use pre-fabricated floating structures.

Most pontoon bridges are designed for temporary use, but bridges across water bodies with a constant water level can remain in place much longer. Hobart Bridge, a long pontoon bridge built 1943 in Hobart, Tasmania was only replaced after 21 years. The fourth Galata Bridge that spans the Golden Horn in Istanbul, Turkey was built in 1912 and operated for 80 years.

Provisional and lightweight pontoon bridges are easily damaged. The bridge can be dislodged or inundated when the load limit of the bridge is exceeded. The bridge can be induced to sway or oscillate in a hazardous manner from the swell, from a storm, a flood or a fast moving load. Ice or floating objects (flotsam) can accumulate on the pontoons, increasing the drag from river current and potentially damaging the bridge. See below for floating pontoon failures and disasters.

== Historic uses ==
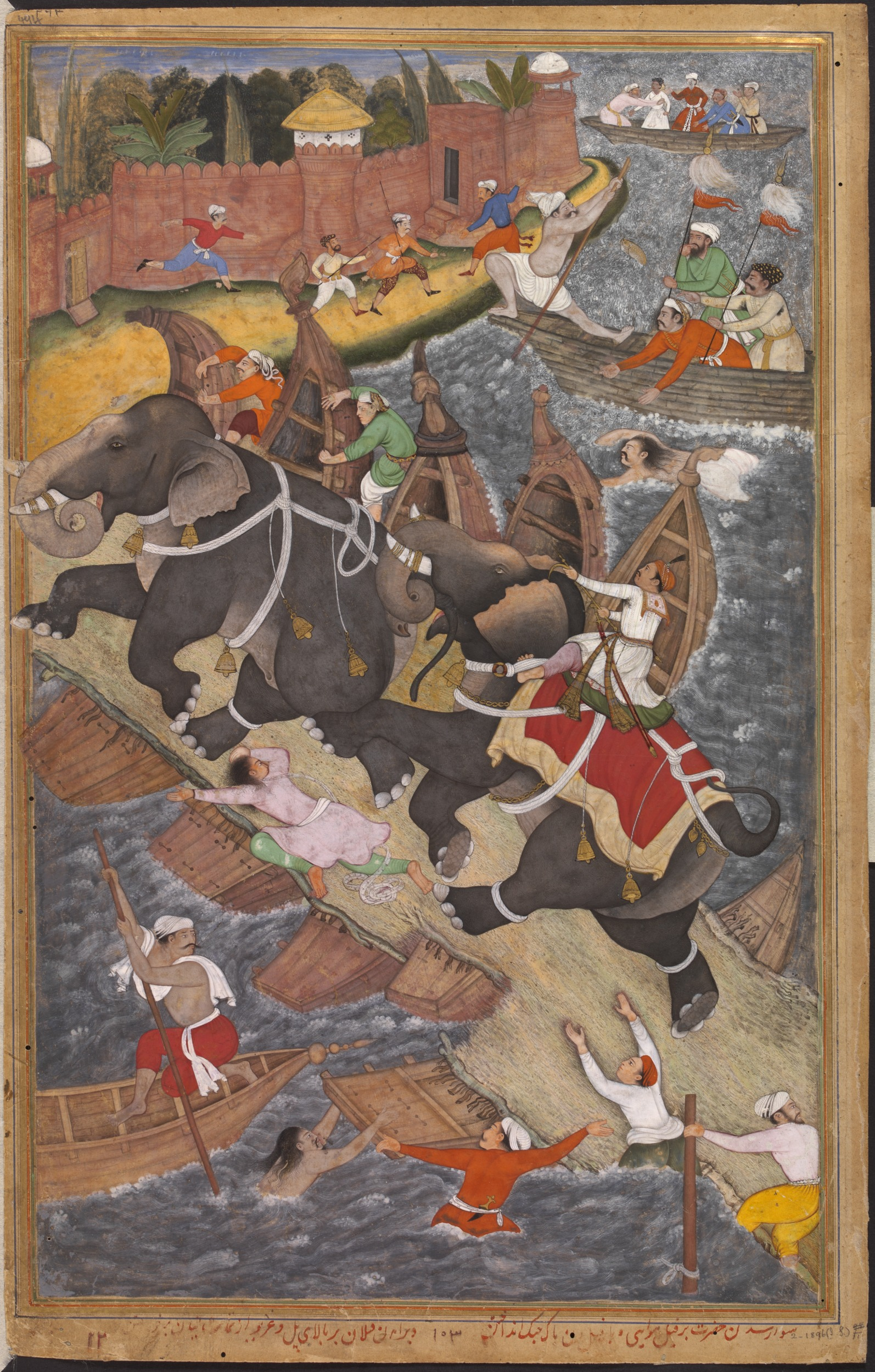
Mughal emperor Akbar the Great riding the ferocious elephant Hawa'i, pursuing another elephant across a collapsing bridge of boats (left), in Basawan and Chetar Munti's "Akbar's Adventure with the Elephant Hawa’i", dated 1561

=== Ancient China ===
In ancient China, the Zhou dynasty Chinese text of the Shi Jing (Book of Odes) records that King Wen of Zhou was the first to create a pontoon bridge in the 11th century BC. However, the historian Joseph Needham has pointed out that in all likely scenarios, the temporary pontoon bridge was invented during the 9th or 8th century BC in China, as this part was perhaps a later addition to the book (considering how the book had been edited up until the Han dynasty, 202 BC – 220 AD). Although earlier temporary pontoon bridges had been made in China, the first secure and permanent ones (and linked with iron chains) in China came first during the Qin dynasty (221–207 BC). The later Song dynasty (960–1279 AD) Chinese statesman Cao Cheng once wrote of early pontoon bridges in China (spelling of Chinese in Wade-Giles format):

The Chhun Chhiu Hou Chuan says that in the 58th year of the Zhou King Nan (257 BC), there was invented in the Qin State the floating bridge (fou chhiao) with which to cross rivers. But the Ta Ming ode in the Shih Ching (Book of Odes) says (of King Wen) that he 'joined boats and made of them a bridge' over the River Wei. Sun Yen comments that this shows that the boats were arranged in a row, like the beams (of a house) with boards laid (transversely) across them, which is just the same as the pontoon bridge of today. Tu Yu also thought this. ... Cheng Khang Chheng says that the Zhou people invented it and used it whenever they had occasion to do so, but the Qin people, to whom they handed it down, were the first to fasten it securely together (for permanent use).

During the Eastern Han dynasty (25–220 AD), the Chinese created a very large pontoon bridge that spanned the width of the Yellow River. There was also the rebellion of Gongsun Shu in 33 AD, where a large pontoon bridge with fortified posts was constructed across the Yangtze River, eventually broken through with ramming ships by official Han troops under Commander Cen Peng. During the late Eastern Han into the Three Kingdoms period, during the Battle of Chibi in 208 AD, the Prime Minister Cao Cao once linked the majority of his fleet together with iron chains, which proved to be a fatal mistake once he was thwarted with a fire attack by Sun Quan's fleet.

The armies of Emperor Taizu of Song had a large pontoon bridge built across the Yangtze River in 974 in order to secure supply lines during the Song dynasty's conquest of the Southern Tang.

On October 22, 1420, Ghiyasu'd-Din Naqqah, the official diarist of the embassy sent by the Timurid ruler of Persia, Mirza Shahrukh (r. 1404–1447), to the Ming dynasty of China during the reign of the Yongle Emperor (r. 1402–1424), recorded his sight and travel over a large floating pontoon bridge at Lanzhou (constructed earlier in 1372) as he crossed the Yellow River on this day. He wrote that it was:

... composed of twenty three boats, of great excellence and strength attached together by a long chain of iron as thick as a man's thigh, and this was moored on each side to an iron post as thick as a man's waist extending a distance of ten cubits on the land and planted firmly in the ground, the boats being fastened to this chain by means of big hooks. There were placed big wooden planks over the boats so firmly and evenly that all the animals were made to pass over it without difficulty.

=== Greco-Roman era ===
Roman depictions of pontoon bridges, 2nd century AD

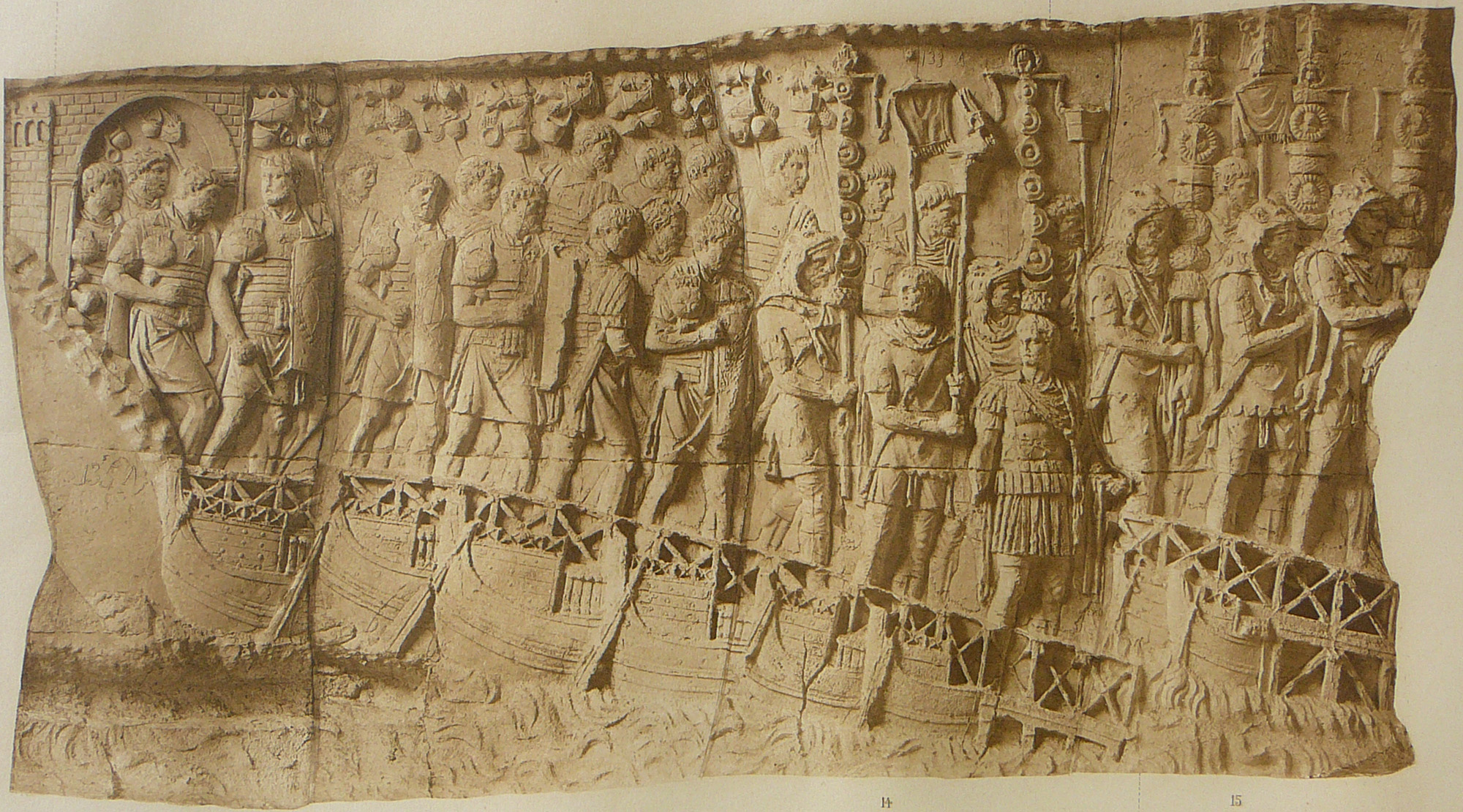
Roman legionaries marching across a pontoon bridge, a relief scene from the column of Emperor Trajan (r. 98–117 AD) in Rome, Italy (monochrome, from the photographs by Conrad Cichorius)

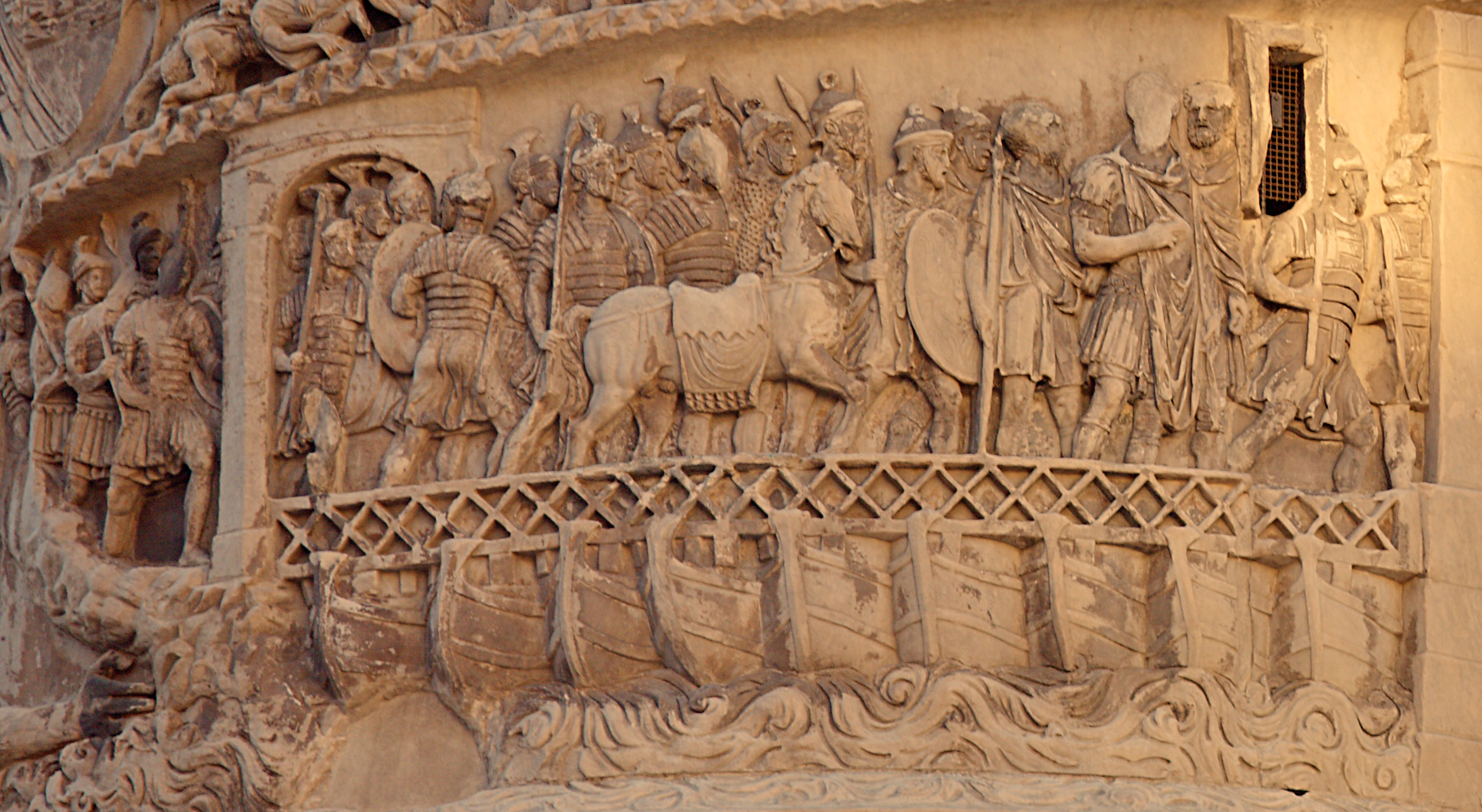
Roman Legionaries crossing the Danube River by pontoon bridge, as depicted in relief on the column of Emperor Marcus Aurelius (r. 161–180 AD) in Rome, Italy

The Greek writer Herodotus in his Histories, records several pontoon bridges. Emperor Caligula built a 2-mile (3.2 km) bridge at Baiae in 37 AD. For Emperor Darius I The Great of Persia (522–485 BC), the Greek Mandrocles of Samos once engineered a 2-kilometre (1.2 mi) pontoon bridge that stretched across the Bosporus, linking Asia to Europe, so that Darius could pursue the fleeing Scythians as well as move his army into position in the Balkans to overwhelm Macedon. Other spectacular pontoon bridges were Xerxes' Pontoon Bridges across the Hellespont by Xerxes I in 480 BC to transport his huge army into Europe:

and meanwhile other chief-constructors proceeded to make the bridges; and thus they made them: They put together fifty-oared galleys and triremes, three hundred and sixty to be under the bridge towards the Euxine Sea, and three hundred and fourteen to be under the other, the vessels lying in the direction of the stream of the Hellespont (though crosswise in respect to the Pontus), to support the tension of the ropes. They placed them together thus, and let down very large anchors, those on the one side towards the Pontus because of the winds which blow from within outwards, and on the other side, towards the West and the Egean, because of the South-East and South Winds. They left also an opening for a passage through, so that any who wished might be able to sail into the Pontus with small vessels, and also from the Pontus outwards. Having thus done, they proceeded to stretch tight the ropes, straining them with wooden windlasses, not now appointing the two kinds of rope to be used apart from one another, but assigning to each bridge two ropes of white flax and four of the papyrus ropes. The thickness and beauty of make was the same for both, but the flaxen ropes were heavier in proportion, and of this rope a cubit weighed one talent. When the passage was bridged over, they sawed up logs of wood, and making them equal in length to the breadth of the bridge they laid them above the stretched ropes, and having set them thus in order they again fastened them above. When this was done, they carried on brushwood, and having set the brushwood also in place, they carried on to it earth; and when they had stamped down the earth firmly, they built a barrier along on each side, so that the baggage-animals and horses might not be frightened by looking out over the sea.

According to John Hale's Lords of the Sea, to celebrate the onset of the Sicilian Expedition (415 - 413 B.C.), the Athenian general, Nicias, paid builders to engineer an extraordinary pontoon bridge composed of gilded and tapestried ships for a festival that drew Athenians and Ionians across the sea to the sanctuary of Apollo on Delos. On the occasion when Nicias was a sponsor, young Athenians paraded across the boats, singing as they walked, to give the armada a spectacular farewell.

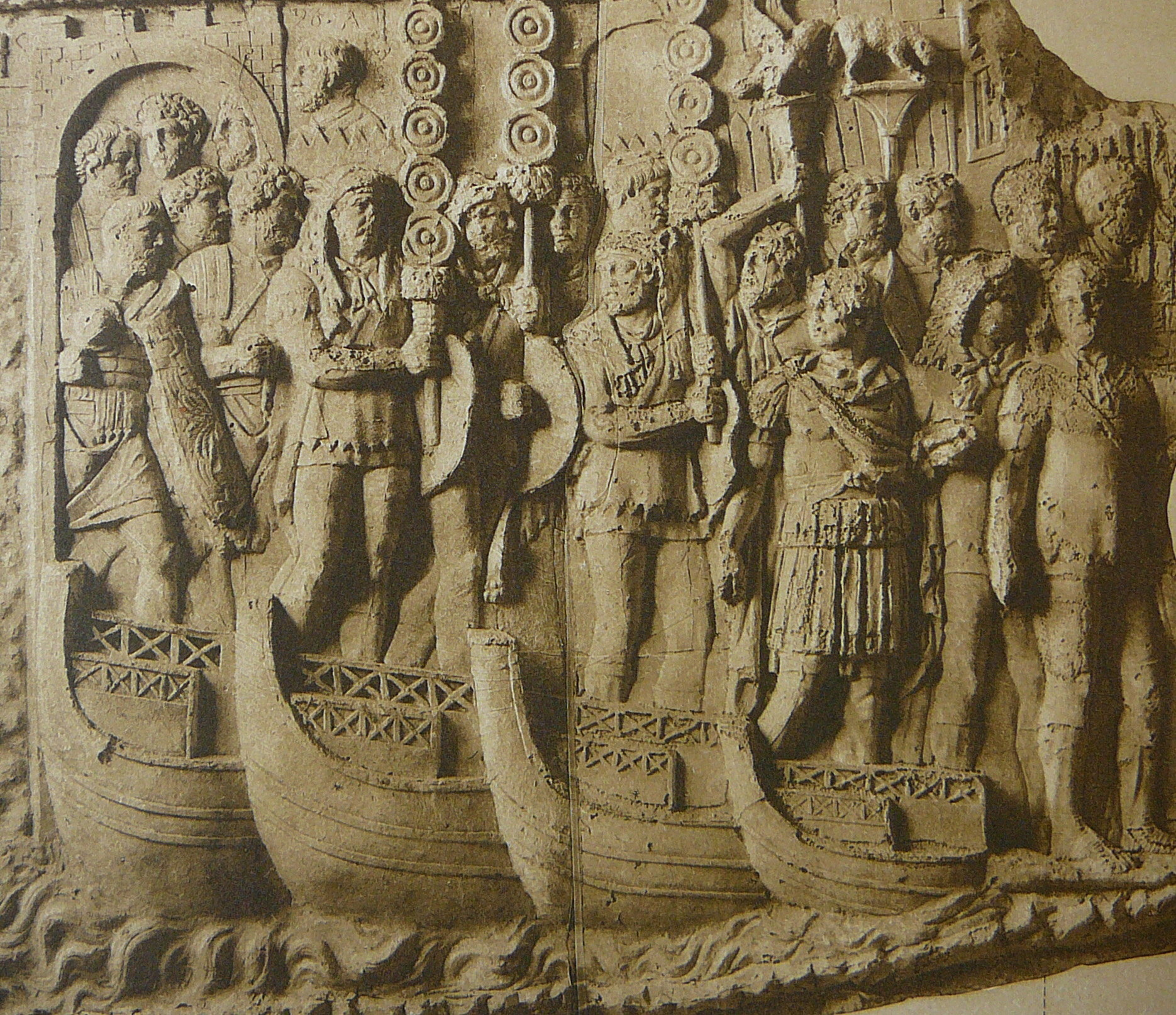
A relief of a Roman bridge of boats by Cichorius

The late Roman writer Vegetius, in his work De Re Militari, wrote:

But the most commodious invention is that of the small boats hollowed out of one piece of timber and very light both by their make and the quality of the wood. The army always has a number of these boats upon carriages, together with a sufficient quantity of planks and iron nails. Thus with the help of cables to lash the boats together, a bridge is instantly constructed, which for the time has the solidity of a bridge of stone.

The emperor Caligula is said to have ridden a horse across a pontoon bridge stretching two miles between Baiae and Puteoli while wearing the armour of Alexander the Great to mock a soothsayer who had claimed he had "no more chance of becoming emperor than of riding a horse across the Bay of Baiae". Caligula's construction of the bridge cost a massive sum of money and added to discontent with his rule.

=== Middle Ages ===
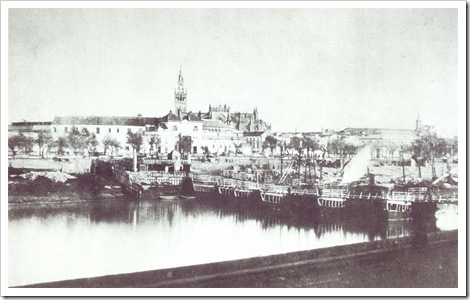
The old Puente de barcas, connected Seville and Triana from 1171 to 1851

During the Middle Ages, pontoons were used alongside regular boats to span rivers during campaigns, or to link communities which lacked resources to build permanent bridges. The Hun army of Attila built a bridge across the Nišava during the siege of Naissus in 442 to bring heavy siege towers within range of the city. Sassanid forces crossed the Euphrates on a quickly built pontoon bridge during the siege of Kallinikos in 542. The Ostrogothic Kingdom constructed a fortified bridge across the Tiber during the siege of Rome in 545 to block Byzantine general Belisarius' relief flotillas to the city. The Avar Khaganate forced Syriac-Roman engineers to construct two pontoon bridges across the Sava during the siege of Sirmium in 580 to completely surround the city with their troops and siege works.

Emperor Heraclius crossed the Bosporus on horseback on a large pontoon bridge in 638. The army of the Umayyad Caliphate built a pontoon bridge over the Bosporus in 717 during the siege of Constantinople (717–718). The Carolingian army of Charlemagne constructed a portable pontoon bridge of anchored boats bound together and used it to cross the Danube during campaigns against the Avar Khaganate in the 790s. Charlemagne's army built two fortified pontoon bridges across the Elbe in 789 during a campaign against the Slavic Veleti. The German army of Otto the Great employed three pontoon bridges, made from pre-fabricated materials, to rapidly cross the Recknitz river at the Battle on the Raxa in 955 and win decisively against the Slavic Obotrites. Tenth-Century German Ottonian capitularies demanded that royal fiscal estates maintain watertight, river-fordable wagons for purposes of war.

The Danish Army of Cnut the Great completed a pontoon bridge across the Helge River during the Battle of Helgeå in 1026. Crusader forces constructed a pontoon bridge across the Orontes to expedite resupply during the siege of Antioch in December 1097. According to the chronicles, the earliest floating bridge across the Dnieper was built in 1115. It was located near Vyshhorod, Kiev. Bohemian troops under the command of Frederick I, Holy Roman Emperor crossed the Adige in 1157 on a pontoon bridge built in advance by the people of Verona on orders of the German Emperor.

The French Royal Army of King Philip II of France constructed a pontoon bridge across the Seine to seize Les Andelys from the English at the siege of Château Gaillard in 1203. During the Fifth Crusade, the Crusaders built two pontoon bridges across the Nile at the siege of Damietta (1218–1219), including one supported by 38 boats. On 27 May 1234, Crusader troops crossed the river Ochtum in Germany on a pontoon bridge during the fight against the Stedingers. Imperial Mongol troops constructed a pontoon bridge at the Battle of Mohi in 1241 to outflank the Hungarian army. The French army of King Louis IX of France crossed the Charente on multiple pontoon bridges during the Battle of Taillebourg on 21 July 1242. Louis IX had a pontoon bridge built across the Nile to provide unimpeded access to troops and supplies in early March 1250 during the Seventh Crusade.

A Florentine army erected a pontoon bridge across the Arno during the siege of Pisa in 1406. The English army of John Talbot, 1st Earl of Shrewsbury crossed the Oise across a pontoon bridge of portable leather vessels in 1441. Ottoman engineers built a pontoon bridge across the Golden Horn during the siege of Constantinople (1453), using over a thousand barrels. The bridge was strong enough to support carts. The Ottoman Army constructed a pontoon bridge during the siege of Rhodes (1480). Venetian pioneers built a floating bridge across the Adige at the Battle of Calliano (1487).

=== Early modern period ===
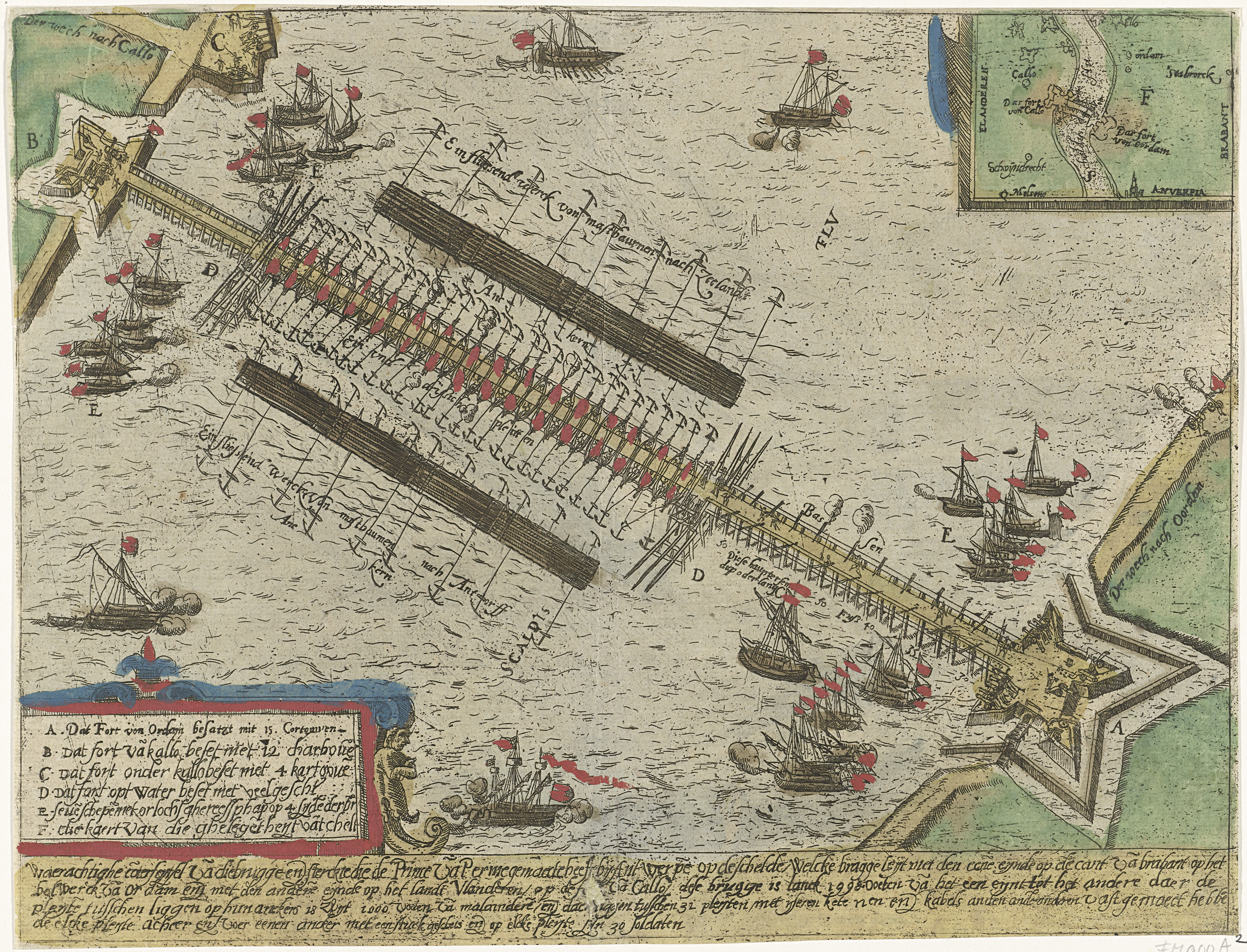
Parma's bridge over the Scheldt in 1584, built of ships. 1616 illustration.

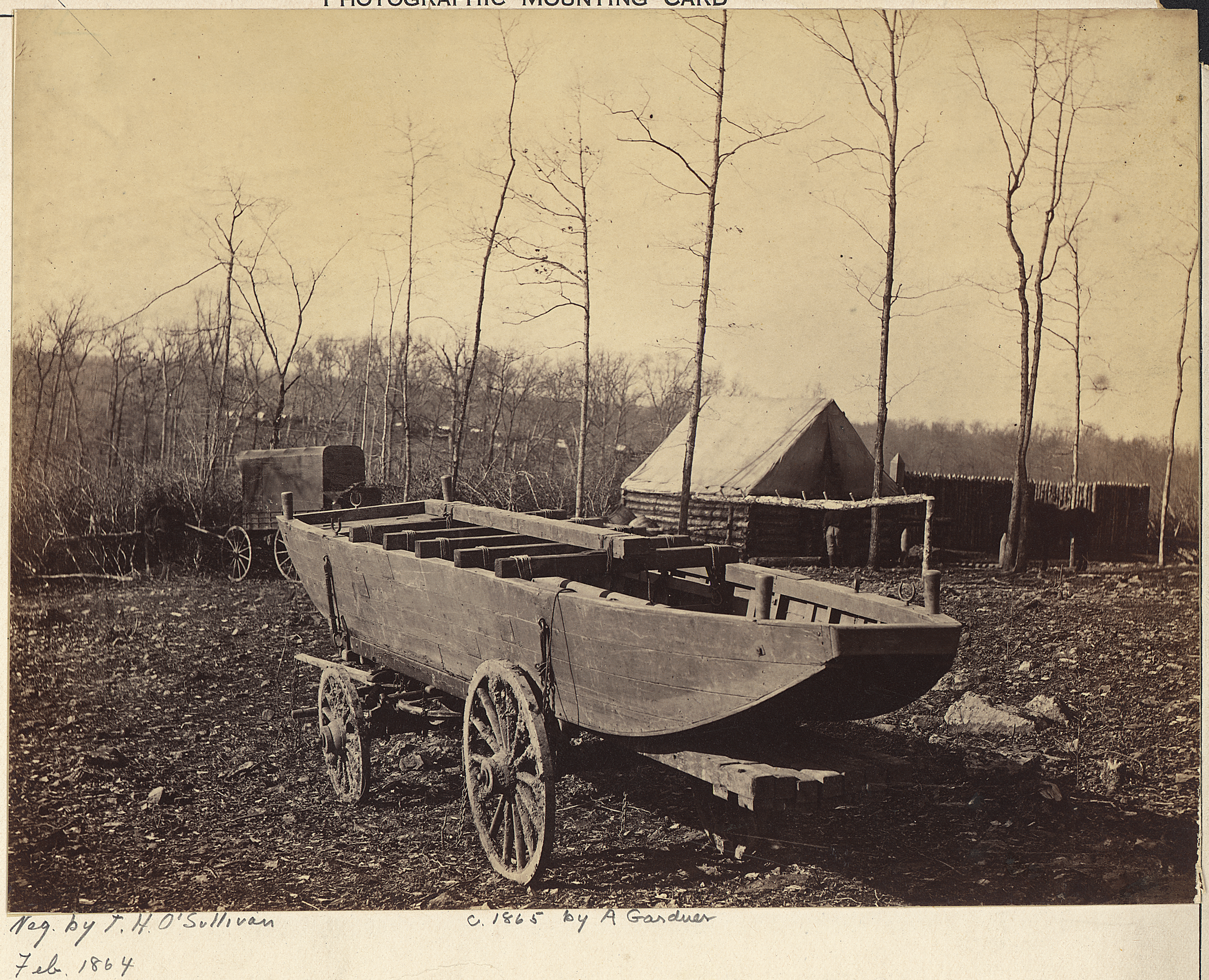
Pontoon boat of the U.S. Army, 1864

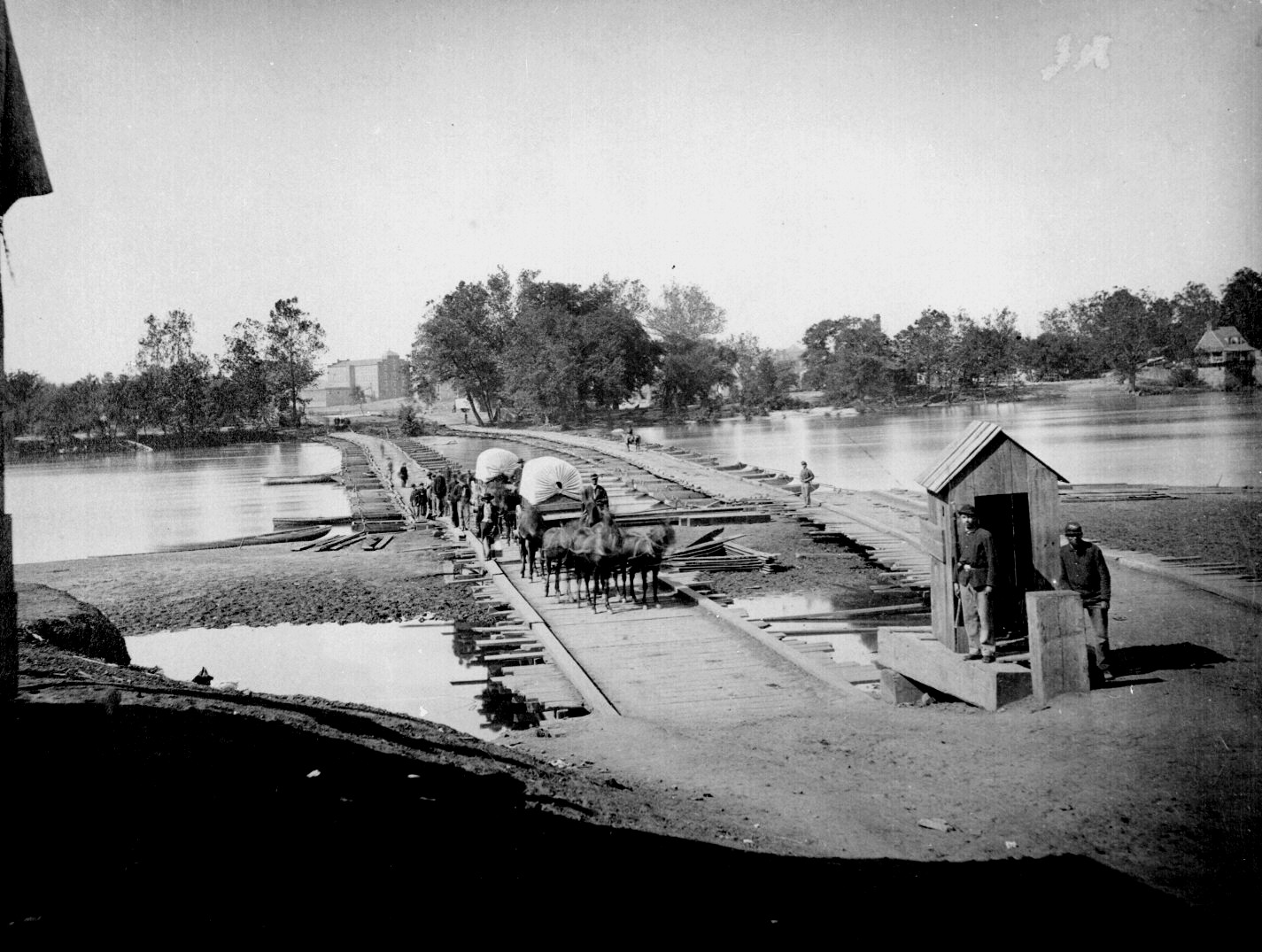
Pontoon bridge across the James River at Richmond, Virginia, 1865

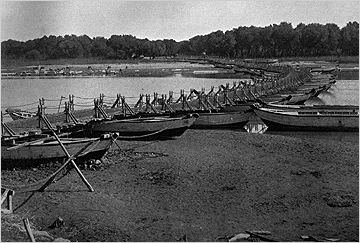
A bridge of boats over the Ravi River in British India, 1895

Before the Battle of Worcester, the final battle of the English Civil War, on 30 August 1651, Oliver Cromwell delayed the start of the battle to give time for two pontoon bridges to be constructed, one over the River Severn and the other over the River Teme, close to their confluence. This allowed Cromwell to move his troops West of the Severn during the action on 3 September 1651 and was crucial to the victory by his New Model Army.

The Spanish Army constructed a pontoon bridge at the Battle of Río Bueno in 1654. However, as the bridge broke apart it all ended in a sound defeat of the Spanish by local Mapuche-Huilliche forces. French general Jean Lannes's troops built a pontoon bridge to cross the Po river prior to the Battle of Montebello (1800). Napoleon's Grande Armée made extensive use of pontoon bridges at the battles of Aspern-Essling and Wagram under the supervision of General Henri Gatien Bertrand. General Jean Baptiste Eblé's engineers erected four pontoon bridges in a single night across the Dnieper during the Battle of Smolensk (1812). Working in cold water, Eblé's Dutch engineers constructed a 100-meter-long pontoon bridge during the Battle of Berezina to allow the Grande Armée to escape to safety. During the Peninsular War the British army transported "tin pontoons" that were lightweight and could be quickly turned into a floating bridge.

Lt Col Charles Pasley of the Royal School of Military Engineering at Chatham England developed a new form of pontoon which was adopted in 1817 by the British Army. The system used transom sterned sections that could be cobined to make a double-ended pontoon. Each half was enclosed, reducing the risk of swamping, and the sections bore multiple lashing points.

The "Palsey pontoon" lasted until 1836 when it was replaced by the "Blanshard pontoon" which comprised tin cylinders 3 feet wide and 22 feet long, placed 11 feet apart, making the pontoon very buoyant. The pontoon was tested with the Palsey pontoon on the Medway.

An alternative proposed by Charles Pasley comprised two copper canoes, each 2 foot 8 inches wide and 22 foot long and coming in two sections which were fastened side by side to make a double canoe raft. Copper was used in preference to fast-corroding tin. Lashed at 10 foot centres, these were good for cavalry, infantry and light guns; lashed at 5 foot centres, heavy cannon could cross. The canoes could also be lashed together to form rafts. One cart pulled by two horse carried two half canoes and stores.

A comparison of pontoons used by each nations army shows that almost all were open boats coming in one, two or even three pieces, mainly wood, some with canvas and rubber protection. Belgium used an iron boat; the United States used cylinders split into three.

In 1862, the Union forces commanded by Major General Ambrose Burnside were stuck on the wrong side of the Rappahannock River at the Battle of Fredericksburg for lack of the arrival of the pontoon train, resulting in severe losses. The report of this disaster resulted in the United Kingdom forming and training a Pontoon Troop of Engineers.

During the American Civil War various forms of pontoon bridges were tried and discarded. Wooden pontoons and India rubber bag pontoons shaped like a torpedo proved impractical until the development of cotton-canvas covered pontoons, which required more maintenance but were lightweight and easier to work with and transport. From 1864 a lightweight design known as Cumberland Pontoons, a folding boat system, were widely used during the Atlanta campaign to transport soldiers and artillery across rivers in the South.

In 1872 at a military review before Queen Victoria, a pontoon bridge was thrown across the River Thames at Windsor, Berkshire, where the river was 250 feet (76 m) wide. The bridge, comprising 15 pontoons held by 14 anchors, was completed in 22 minutes and then used to move five battalions of troops across the river. It was removed in 34 minutes the next day.

At Prairie du Chien, Wisconsin, the Pile-Pontoon Railroad Bridge was constructed in 1874 over the Mississippi River to carry a railroad track connecting that city with Marquette, Iowa. Because the river level could vary by as much as 22 feet, the track was laid on an adjustable platform above the pontoons. This unique structure remained in use until the railroad was abandoned in 1961, when it was removed.

The British Blanshard Pontoon stayed in British use until the late 1870s, when it was replaced by the "Blood Pontoon". The Blood Pontoon returned to the open boat system, which enabled use as boats when not needed as pontoons. Side carrying handles helped transportation. The new pontoon proved strong enough to support loaded elephants and siege guns as well as military traction engines.

=== Early 20th century ===
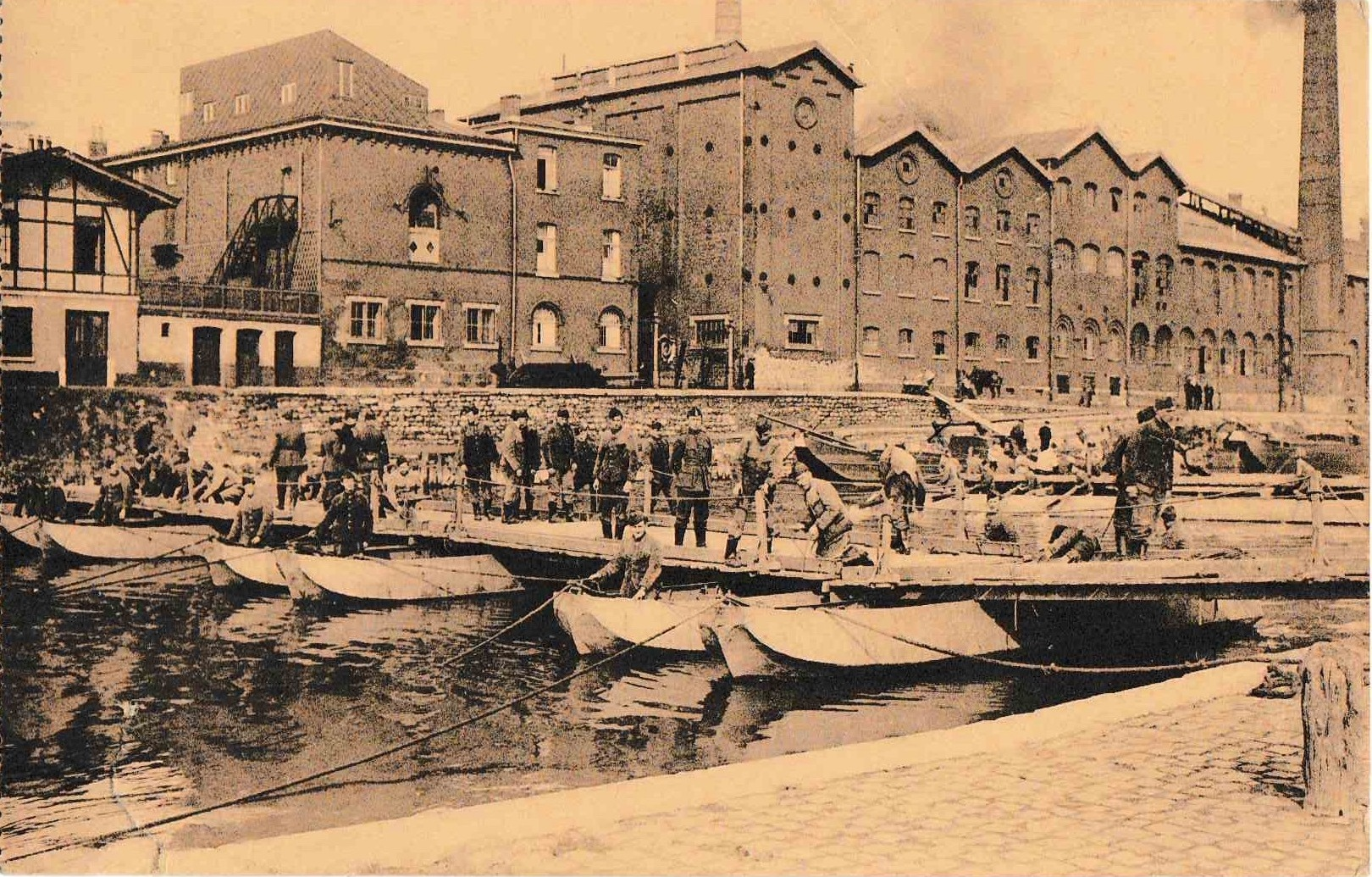
3e régiment du génie (French Wikipedia), The 3rd French Regiment of Pioneers are building a Pontoon Bridge over the river Ourthe in Chênée, Belgium in the 1930s.

The British Blood Pontoon MkII, which took the original and cut it into two halves, was still in use with the British Army in 1924.

The First World War saw developments on "trestles" to form the link between a river bank and the pontoon bridge. Some infantry bridges in WW1 used any material available, including petrol cans as flotation devices.

The Kapok Assault Bridge for infantry was developed for the British Army, using kapok fibre-filled canvas float and timber foot walks. America created their own version.

Folding Boat Equipment was developed in 1928 and went through several versions until it was used in WW2 to complement the Bailey Pontoon. It had a continuous canvas hinge and could fold flat for storage and transportation. When assembled it could carry 15 men and with two boats and some additional toppings it could transport a 3-ton truck. Further upgrades during WW2 resulted in it moving to a Class 9 bridge.

== World War II ==
Pontoon bridges were used extensively during World War II, mainly in the European Theater of Operations. The United States was the principal user, with the United Kingdom next.

=== United States ===
In the United States, combat engineers were responsible for bridge deployment and construction. These were formed principally into Engineer Combat Battalions, which had a wide range of duties beyond bridging, and specialized units, including Light Ponton Bridge Companies, Heavy Ponton Bridge Battalions, and Engineer Treadway Bridge Companies; any of these could be organically attached to infantry units or directly at the divisional, corps, or army level.

American engineers built three types of floating bridges: M1938 infantry footbridges, M1938 ponton bridges, and M1940 treadway bridges, with numerous subvariants of each. These were designed to carry troops and vehicles of varying weight, using either an inflatable pneumatic ponton or a solid aluminum-alloy ponton bridge. Both types of bridges were supported by pontons (known today as "pontoons") fitted with a deck built of balk, which were square, hollow aluminum beams.

American Light Ponton Bridge Company

An Engineer Light Ponton Company consisted of three platoons: two bridge platoons, each equipped with one unit of M3 pneumatic bridge, and a lightly equipped platoon which had one unit of footbridge and equipment for ferrying. The bridge platoons were equipped with the M3 pneumatic bridge, which was constructed of heavy inflatable pneumatic floats and could handle up to 10 short tons (9.1 t); this was suitable for all normal infantry division loads without reinforcement, greater with.

American Heavy Ponton Bridge Battalion

A Heavy Ponton Bridge Battalion was provided with equipage required to provide stream crossing for heavy military vehicles that could not be supported by a light ponton bridge. The Battalion had two lettered companies of two bridge platoons each. Each platoon was equipped with one unit of heavy ponton equipage. The battalion was an organic unit of army and higher echelons. The M1940 could carry up to 25 short tons (23 t). The M1 Treadway Bridge could support up to 20 short tons (18 t). The roadway, made of steel, could carry up to 50 short tons (45 t), while the center section made of 4 inches (100 mm) thick plywood could carry up to 30 short tons (27 t). The wider, heavier tanks used the outside steel treadway while the narrower, lighter jeeps and trucks drove across the bridge with one wheel in the steel treadway and the other on the plywood.

American Engineer Treadway Bridge Company

An Engineer Treadway Bridge Company consisted of company headquarters and two bridge platoons. It was an organic unit of the armored force, and normally was attached to an Armored Engineer Battalion. Each bridge platoon transported one unit of steel treadway bridge equipage for construction of ferries and bridges in river-crossing operations of the armored division. Stream-crossing equipment included utility powerboats, pneumatic floats, and two units of steel treadway bridge equipment, each of which allowed the engineers to build a floating bridge about 540 feet (160 m) in length.

Materials and equipment

Pneumatic ponton

The United States Army Corps of Engineers designed a self-contained bridge transportation and erection system. The Brockway model B666 6 short tons (5.4 t) 6x6 truck chassis (also built under license by Corbitt and White) was used to transport both the bridge's steel and rubber components. A single Brockway truck could carry material for 30 feet (9.1 m) of bridge, including two pontons, two steel saddles that were attached to the pontons, and four treadway sections. Each treadway was 15 feet (4.6 m) long with high guardrails on either side of the 2 feet (0.61 m) wide track.

The truck was mounted with a 4 short tons (3.6 t) hydraulic crane that was used to unload the 45 inches (110 cm) wide steel treadways. A custom designed twin boom arm was attached to rear of the truck bed and helped unroll and place the heavy inflatable rubber pontoons upon which the bridge was laid. The 220 inches (560 cm) wheelbase chassis included a 25,000 pounds (11,000 kg) front winch and extra-large air-brake tanks that also served to inflate the rubber pontoons before they were placed in the water.

A pneumatic float was made of rubberized fabric separated by bulkheads into 12 airtight compartments and inflated with air. The pneumatic float consisted of an outer perimeter tube, a floor, and a removable center tube. The 18 short tons (16 t) capacity float was 8 feet 3 inches (2.51 m) wide, 33 feet (10 m) long, 2 feet 9 inches (0.84 m) deep.

Solid ponton

Solid aluminum-alloy pontons were used in place of pneumatic floats to support heavier bridges and loads. They were also pressed into service for lighter loads as needed.

Treadway

A treadway bridge was a multi-section, prefabricated floating steel bridge supported by pontoons carrying two metal tracks (or "tread ways") forming a roadway. Depending on its weight class, the treadway bridge was supported either by heavy inflatable pneumatic pontons or by aluminum-alloy half-pontons. The aluminum half-pontons were 29 feet 7 inches (9.02 m) long overall, 6 feet 11 inches (2.11 m) wide at the gunwales, and 3 feet 4 inches (1.02 m) deep except at the bow where the gunwale was raised. The gunwales were 6 feet 8 inches (2.03 m) center-to-center. At 6 inches (150 mm) freeboard, the half-ponton has a displacement of 26,500 pounds (12,000 kg). The sides and bow of the half-ponton were gradually sloped, permitting two or more to be nested for transporting or storing.

A treadway bridge could be built of floating spans or fixed spans. An M2 treadway bridge was designed to carry artillery, heavy duty trucks, and medium tanks up to 40 short tons (36 t). This could be of any length, and was what was used over major river obstacles such as the Rhine and Moselle. Doctrine stated that it would take 5 1/2 hours to place a 362-foot section of M2 treadway during daylight and 7 1/2 hours at night. Pergrin says that in practise 50 ft/hour of treadway construction was expected, which is a little slower than the speed specified by doctrine.

By 1943, combat engineers faced the need for bridges to bear weights of 35 tons or more. To increase weight bearing capacity, they used bigger floats to add buoyancy. This overcame the capacity limitation, but the larger floats were both more difficult to transport to the crossing site and requiring more and larger trucks in the divisional and corps trains.

=== United Kingdom ===
A Whale floating roadway leading to a Spud pier at Mulberry A off Omaha Beach

Donald Bailey invented the Bailey bridge, which was made up of modular, pre-fabricated steel trusses capable of carrying up to 40 short tons (36 t) over spans up to 180 feet (55 m). While typically constructed point-to-point over piers, they could be supported by pontoons as well.

The Bailey bridge was used for the first time in 1942. The first version put into service was a Bailey Pontoon and Raft with a 30 feet (9.1 m) single-single Bailey bay supported on two pontoons. A key feature of the Bailey Pontoon was the use of a single span from the bank to the bridge level which eliminated the need for bridge trestles.

For lighter vehicle bridges the Folding Boat Equipment could be used and the Kapok Assault Bridge was available for infantry.

An open sea type of pontoon, another British war time invention, known by their code names, the Mulberry harbours floated across the English Channel to provide harbours for the June 1944 Allied invasion of Normandy. The dock piers were code named "Whale". These piers were the floating roadways that connected the "Spud" pier heads to the land. These pier heads or landing wharves, at which ships were unloaded each consisted of a pontoon with four legs that rested on the sea bed to anchor the pontoon, yet allowed it to float up and down freely with the tide. "Beetles" were pontoons that supported the "Whale" piers. They were moored in position using wires attached to "Kite" anchors which were also designed by Allan Beckett. These anchors had a high holding power as was demonstrated in D+13 Normandy storm where the British Mulberry survived most of the storm damage whereas the American Mulberry, which only had 20% of its Kite Anchors deployed, was destroyed.

=== Gallery ===
Pontoon bridges during World War II

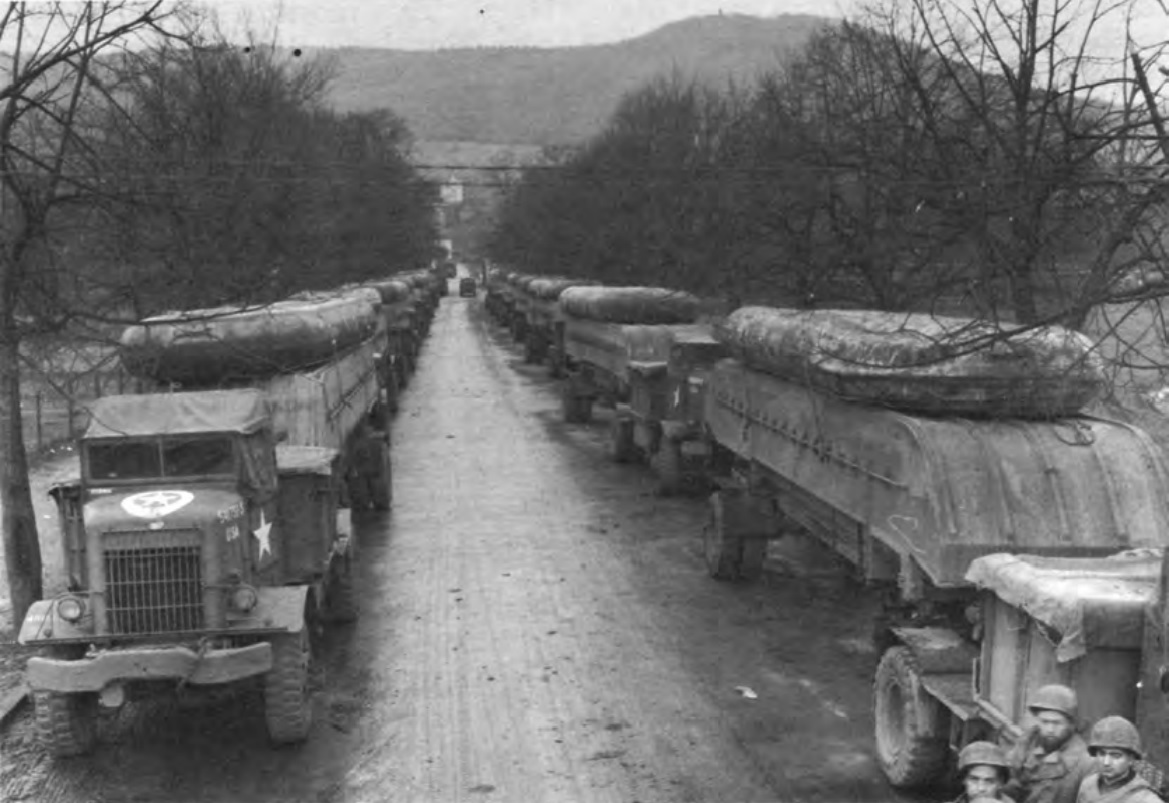
Smaller, lighter pneumatic pontons piggy-backed upon large aluminum heavy pontons for combined transport

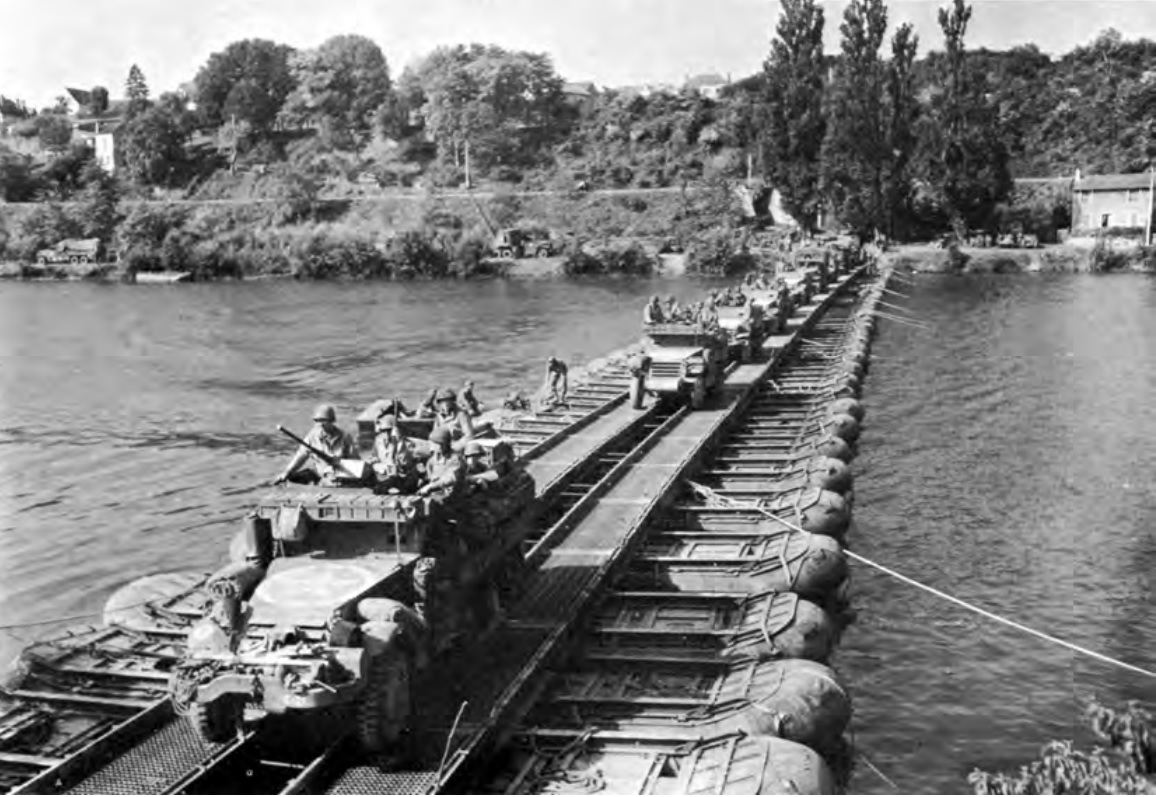
Pneumatic pontons support a treadway bridge

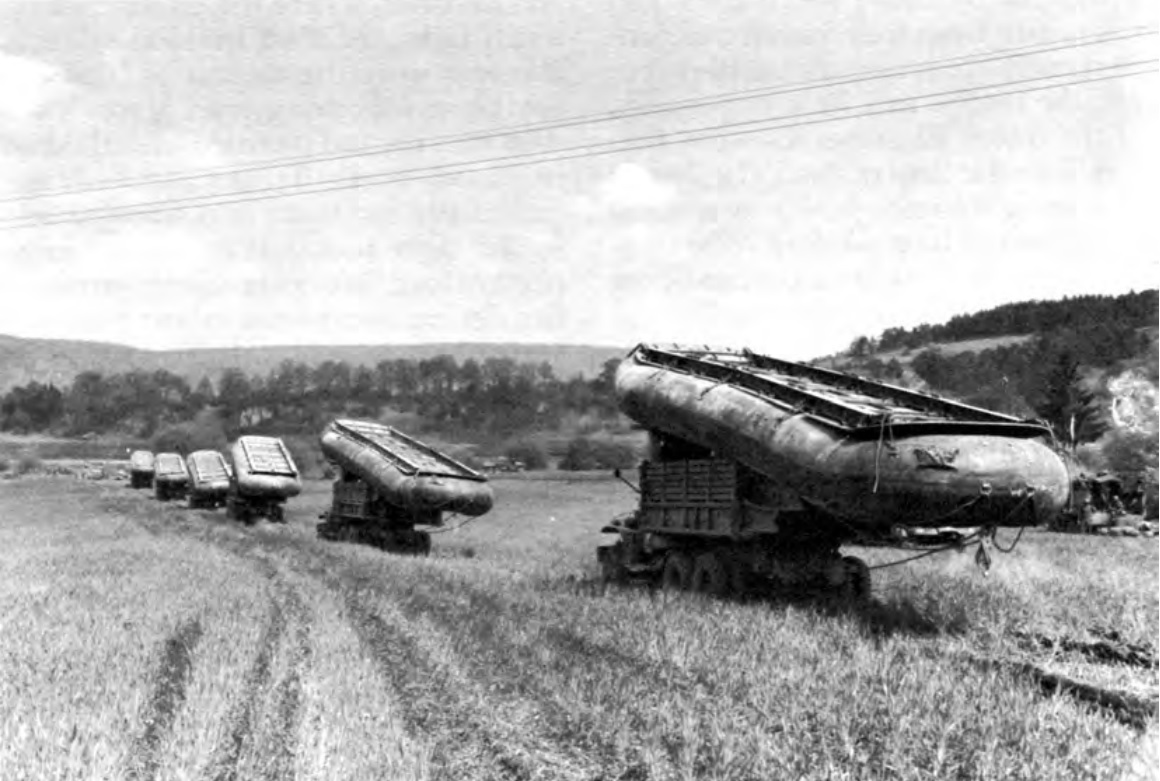
Pneumatic pontons being carried by heavy 6×6 transports

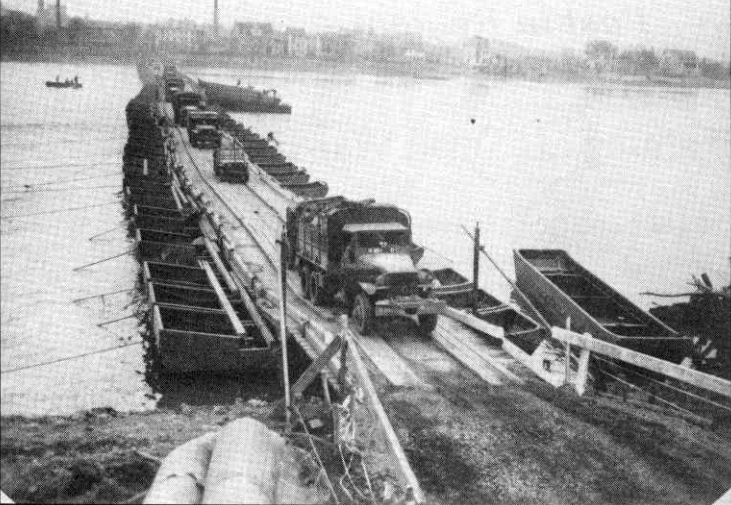
Heavy ponton bridge supported by large aluminum pontons

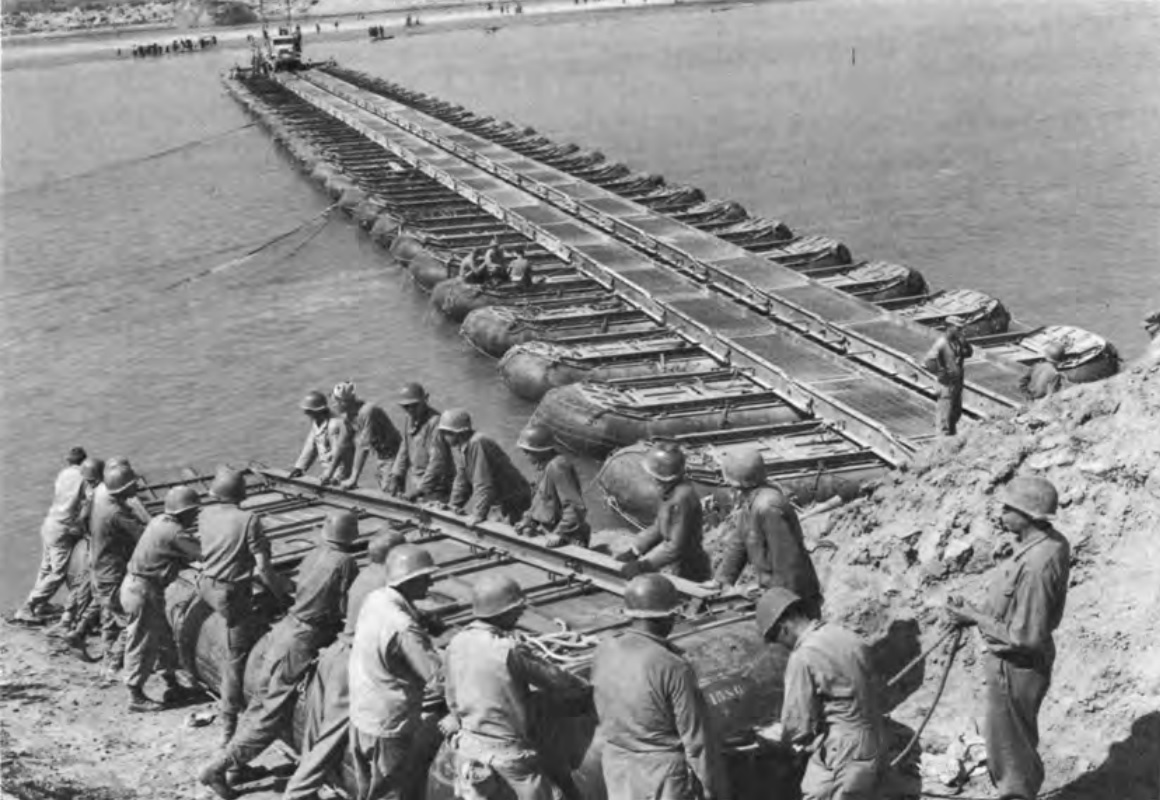
Treadway bridge atop pneumatic pontons

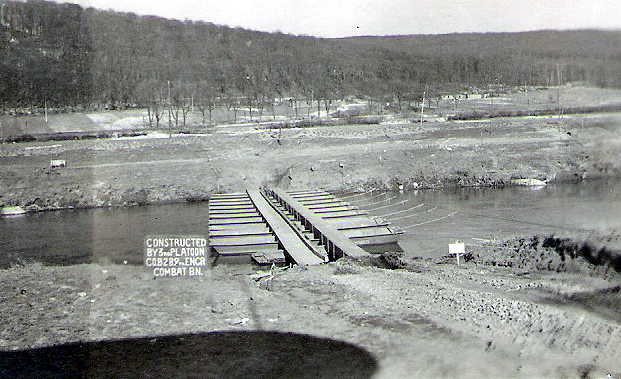
Infantry support bridge supported by light aluminum pontoons

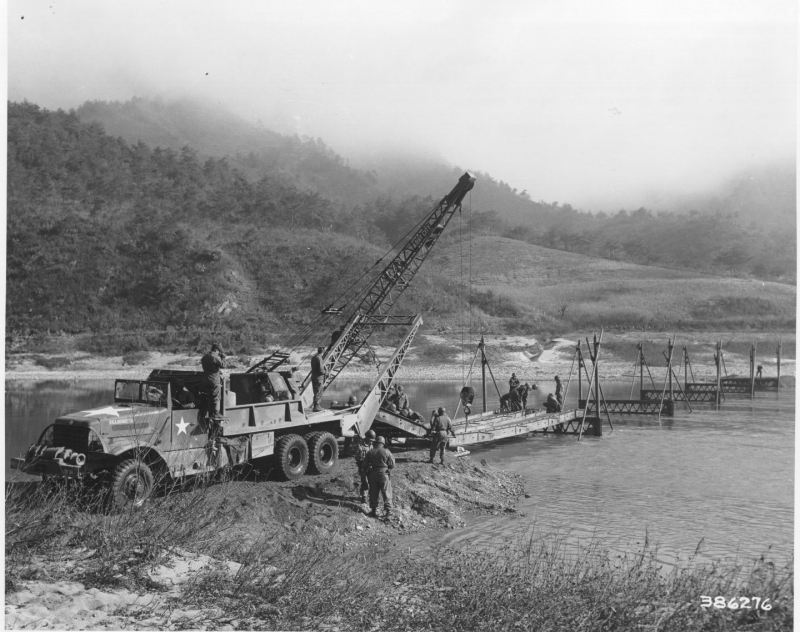
Treadway being installed using truck mounted crane

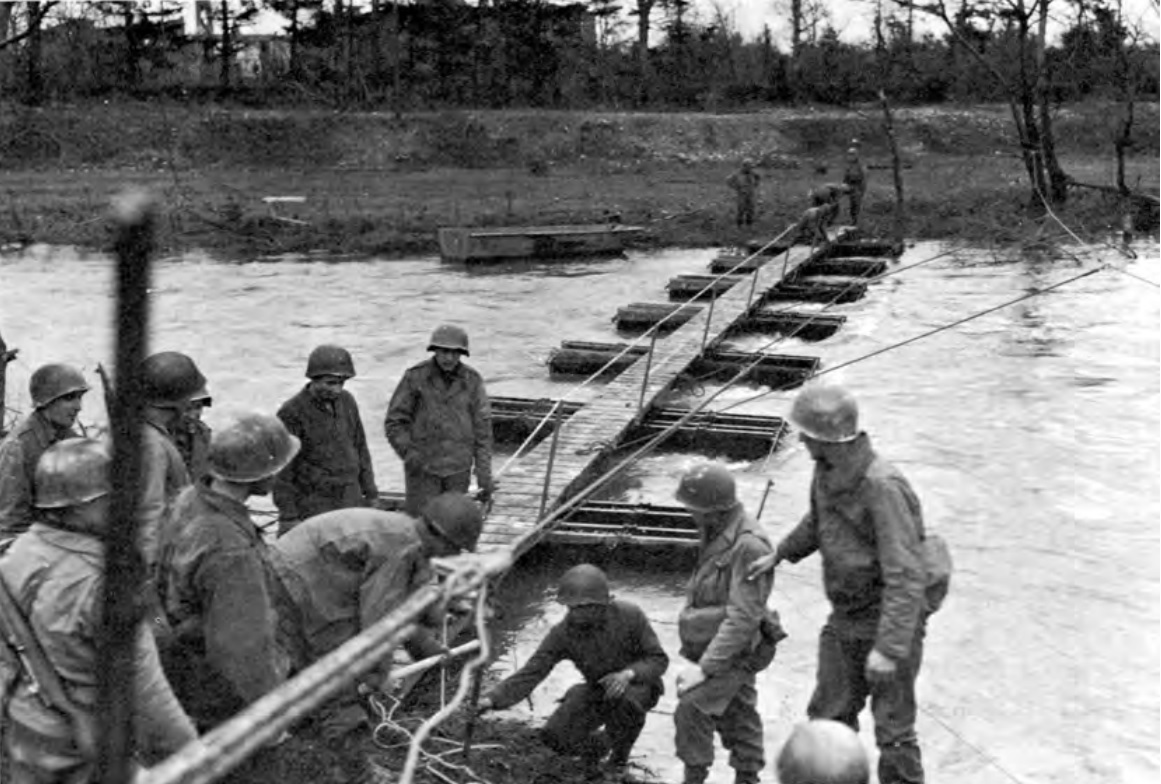
Infantry footbridge supported by pontons

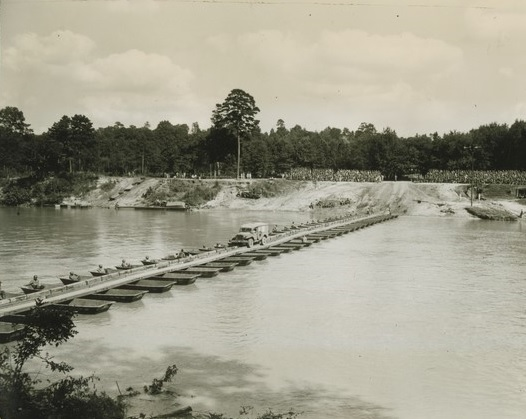
Treadway style infantry support bridge built on light aluminum pontons

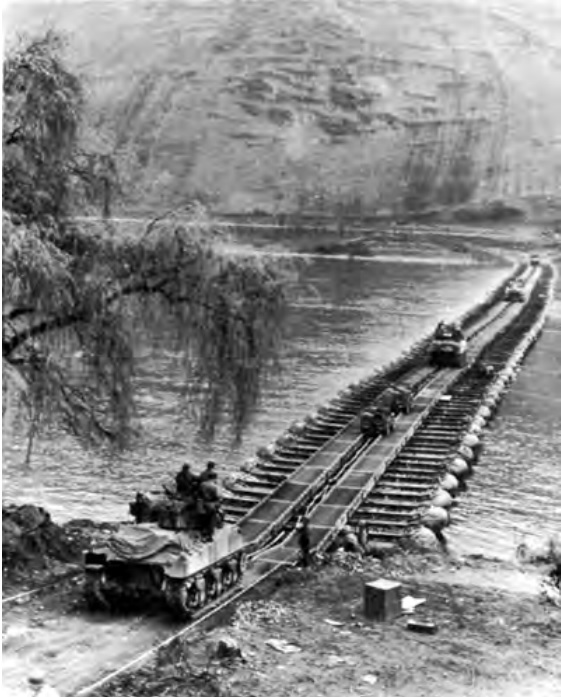
M2 Treadway bridge supported by pneumatic floats

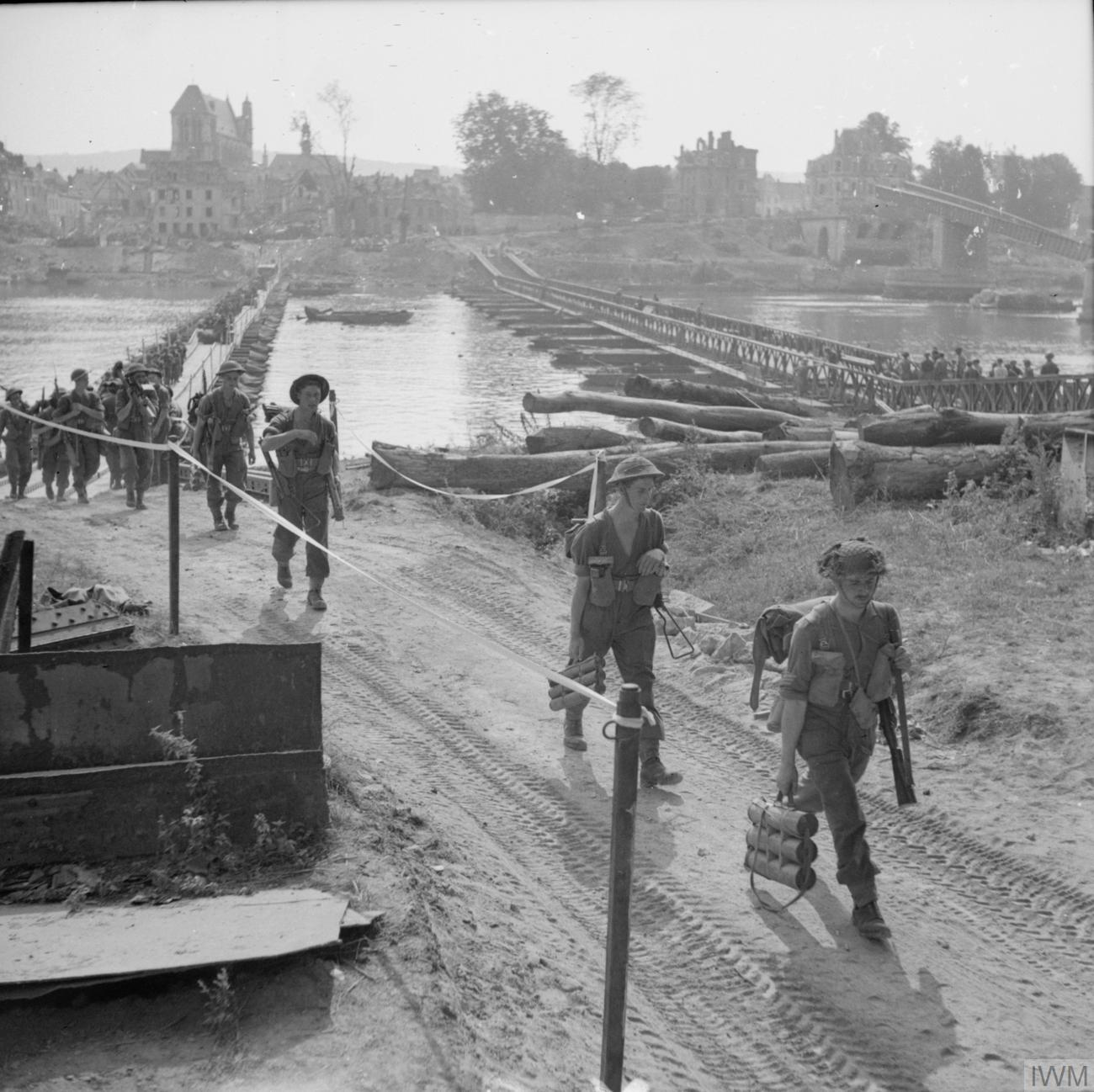
British troops crossing the Seine at Vernon, France on 28 August 1944

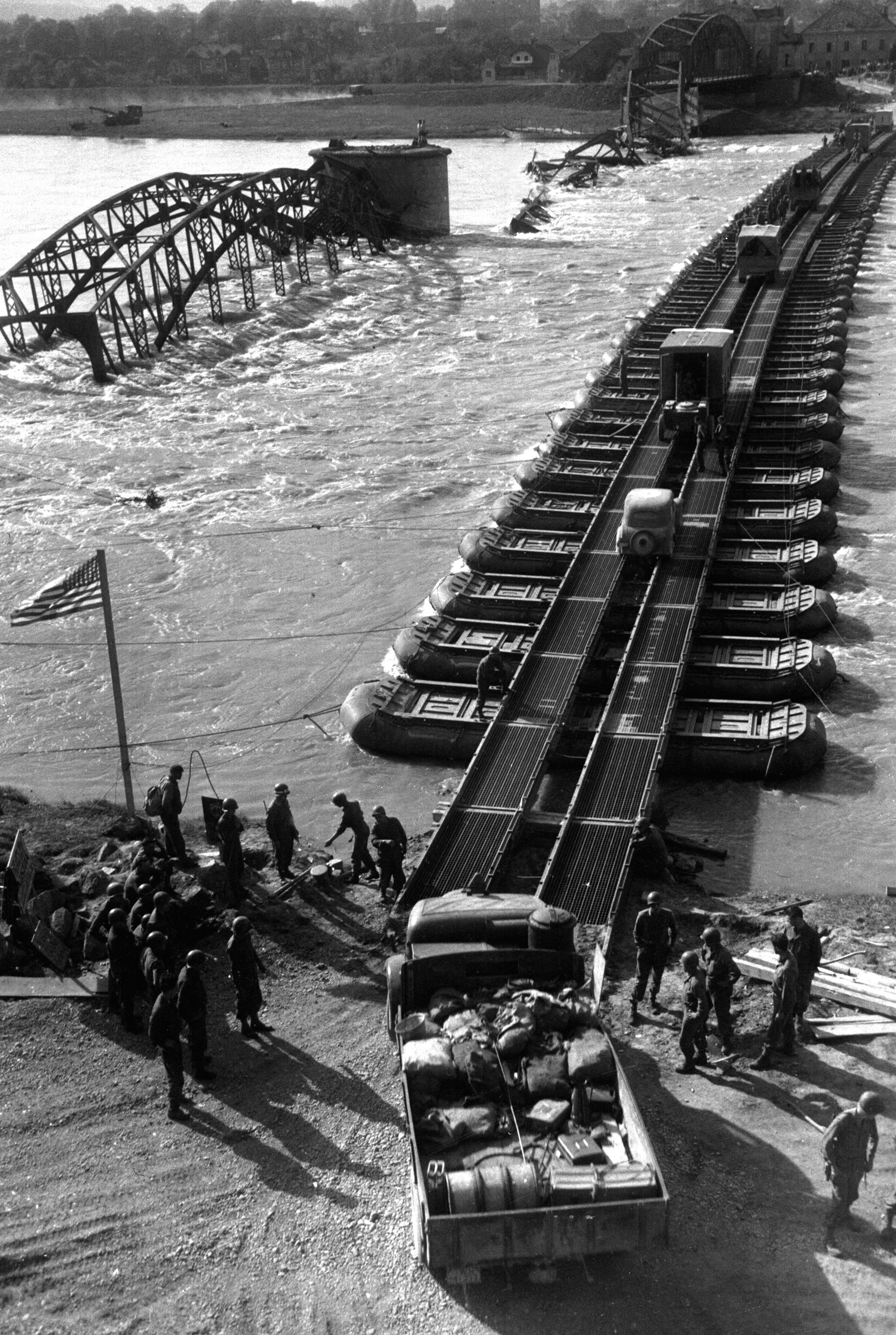
Heavy ponton bridge

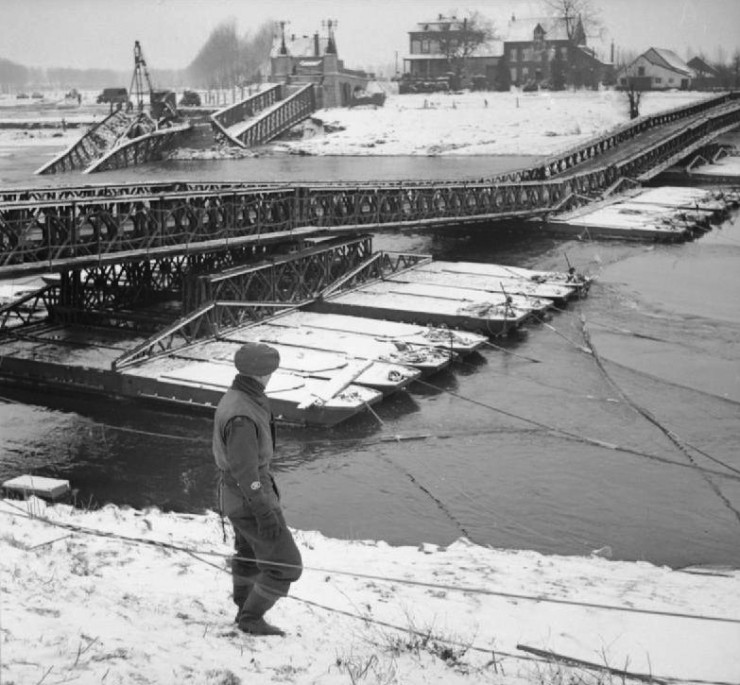
Bailey bridge supported by pontoons

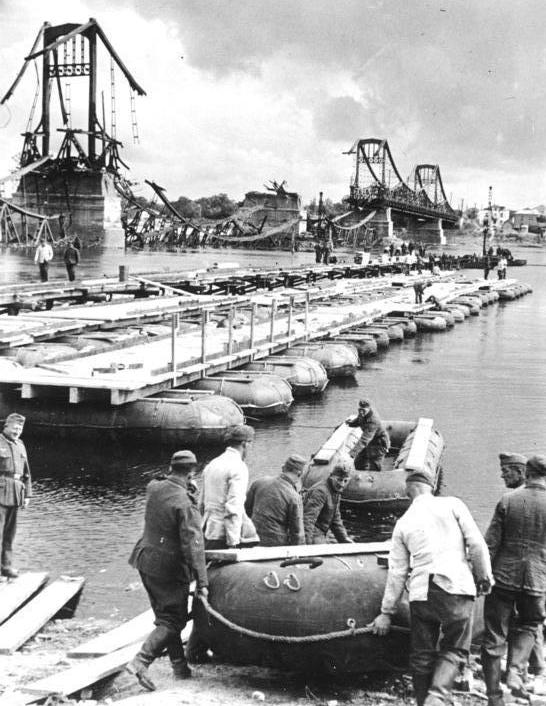
German pioneers construct a pontoon bridge across the Dnieper during the battle of Kiev, September 1941

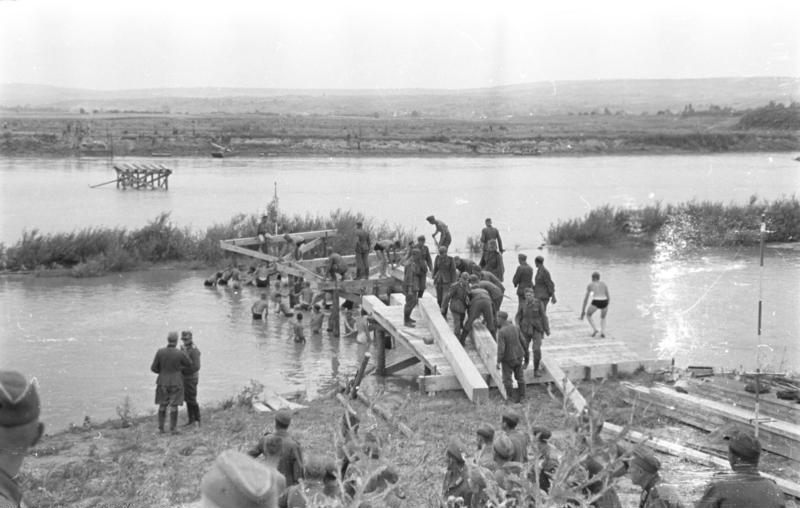
German engineers building a pontoon bridge across the Prut River during the advance towards Uman, July 1941

== Modern military uses ==
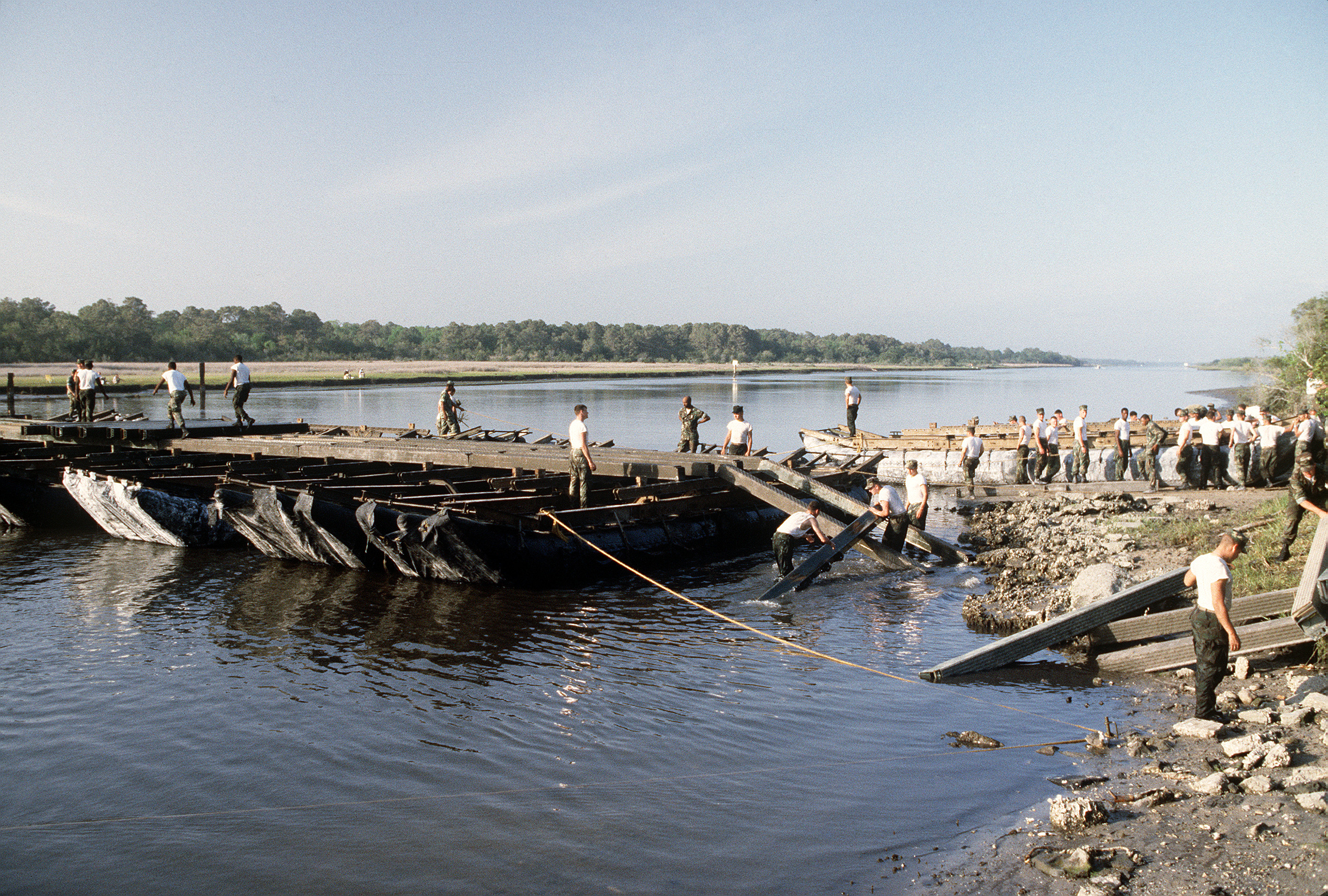
M4T6 pontoon bridge, 1983

Pontoon bridges were extensively used by both armies and civilians throughout the latter half of the 20th century.

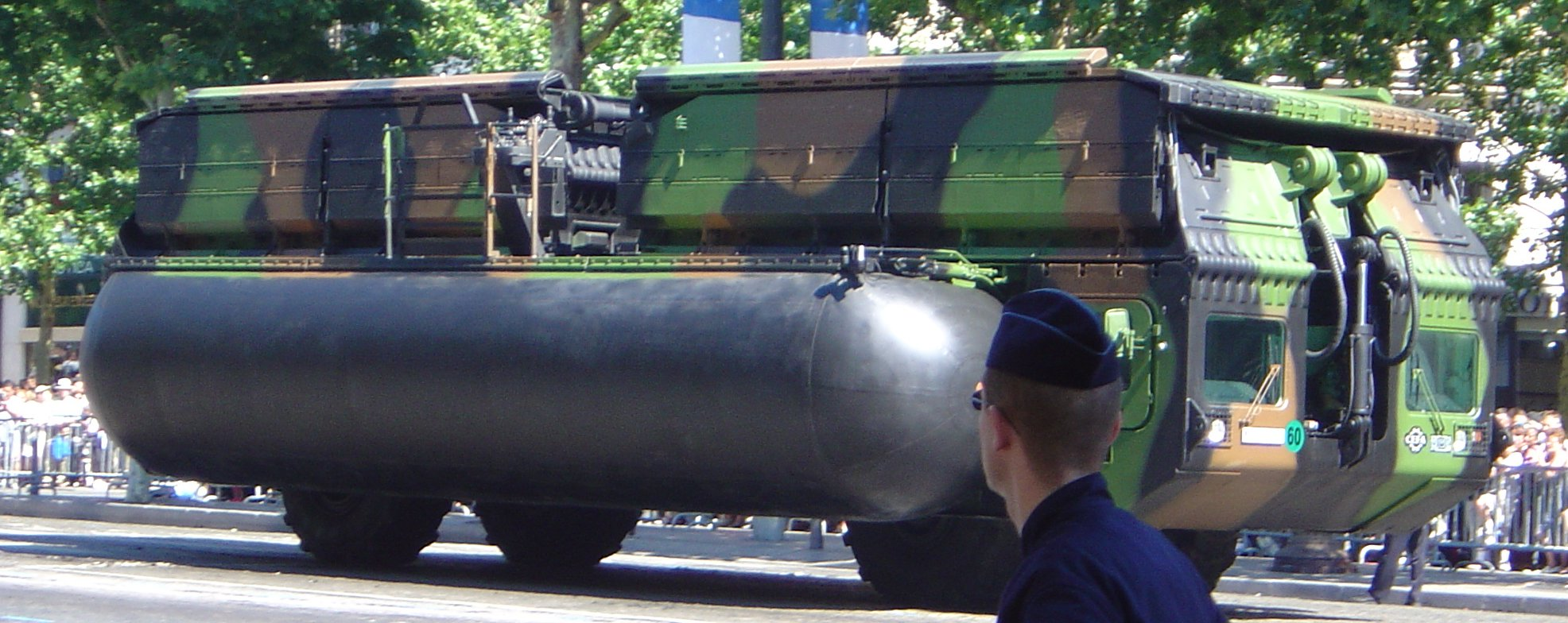
French Army mobile Pontoon bridge in Paris, 2003

From the Post-War period into the early 1980s the U.S. Army and its NATO and other allies employed three main types of pontoon bridge/raft. The M4 bridge featured a lightweight aluminum balk deck supported by rigid aluminum hull pontoons. The M4T6 bridge used the same aluminum balk deck of the M4, but supported instead by inflatable rubber pontoons. The Class 60 bridge consisted of a more robust steel girder and grid deck supported by inflatable rubber pontoons. All three pontoon bridge types were cumbersome to transport and deploy, and slow to assemble, encouraging the development of an easier to transport, deploy and assemble floating bridge.

=== Amphibious float bridges ===
Several alternatives featured a self-propelled amphibious integrated transporter, floating pontoon, bridge deck section that could be delivered and assembled in the water under its own power, linking as many units as required to bridge a gap or form a raft ferry.

An early example was the Engin de Franchissement de l’Avant EFA (mobile bridge) amphibious forward crossing apparatus conceived by French General Jean Gillois in 1955. The system consisted of a wheeled amphibious truck equipped with inflatable outboard flotation sponsons and a rotating vehicle bridge deck section. The system was developed by the West German firm Eisenwerke-Kaiserslautern (EWK) and entered production by the French-German consortium Pontesa. The EFA system was first deployed by the French Army in 1965, and subsequently by the West German Bundeswehr, British Army, and on a very limited basis by the U.S. Army, where it was referred to as Amphibious River Crossing Equipment (ARCE). Production ended in 1973. The EFA was used in combat by the Israel Defense Forces (IDF), which employed former U.S. The Egyptian Army used the equipment to cross the Suez Canal in their attack on Israeli forces during the Yom Kippur War of 1973.

EWK further developed the EFA system into the M2 "Alligator" Amphibious Bridging Vehicle equipped with fold-out aluminum flotation pontoons, which was produced from 1967 to 1970 and sold to the West German, British and Singapore militaries. The M2 was followed by the revised M3 version, entering service in 1996 with Germany, the United Kingdom, Taiwan and Singapore. The M3 was used in combat by British Forces during the Iraq War. More recently, Turkey has developed a similar system in the FNSS Samur wheeled amphibious assault bridge, while the Russian PMM-2 and Chinese GZM003 armoured amphibious assault bridge ride on tracks.

A similar amphibious system, the Mobile Floating Assault Bridge-Ferry (MFAB-F) was developed in the U.S. by Chrysler between 1959 and 1962. As with the French EFA, the MFAB-F consisted of an amphibious truck with a rotating bridge deck section, but there were no outboard flotation sponsons. The MFAB-F was first deployed by the U.S. Army in 1964 and later by Belgium. An improved version was produced by FMC from 1970 to 1976. The MFAB-F remained in service into the early 1980s before being replaced by a simpler continuous pontoon or "ribbon bridge" system.

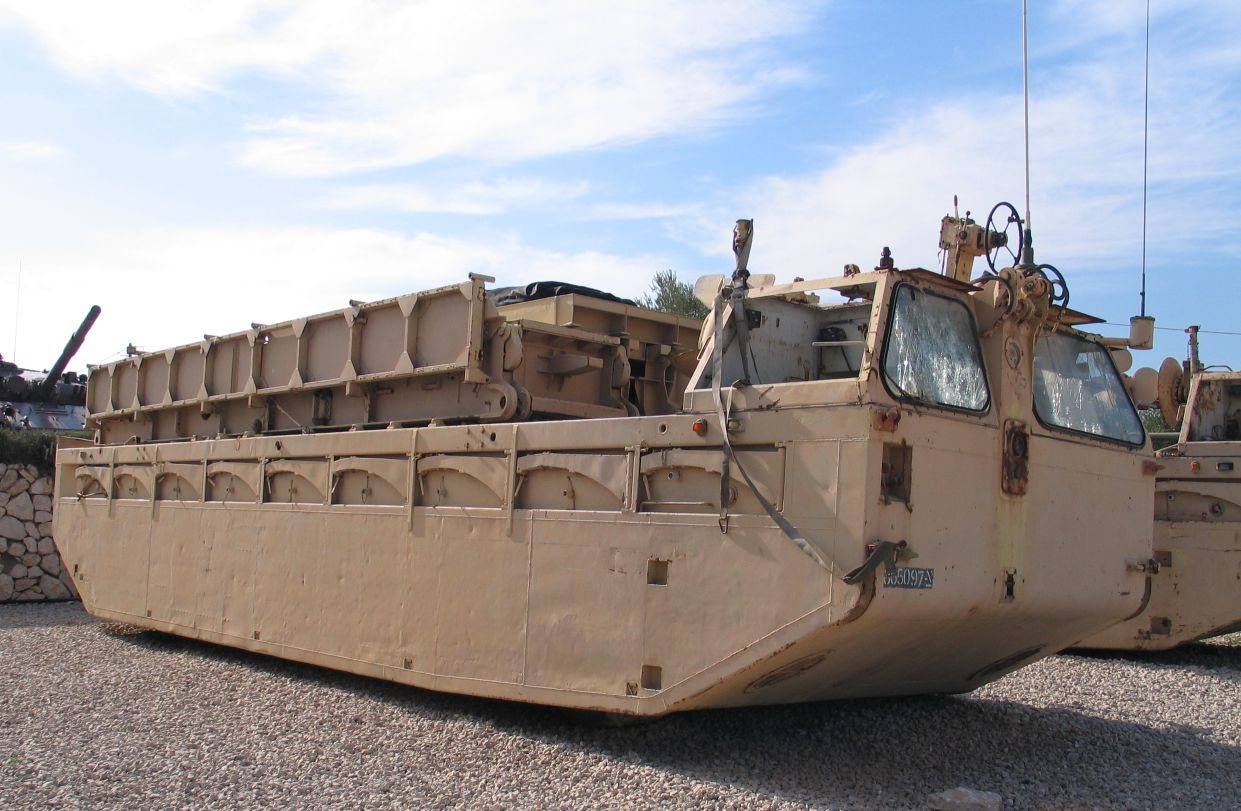
EWK-Gillois amphibious bridging vehicle

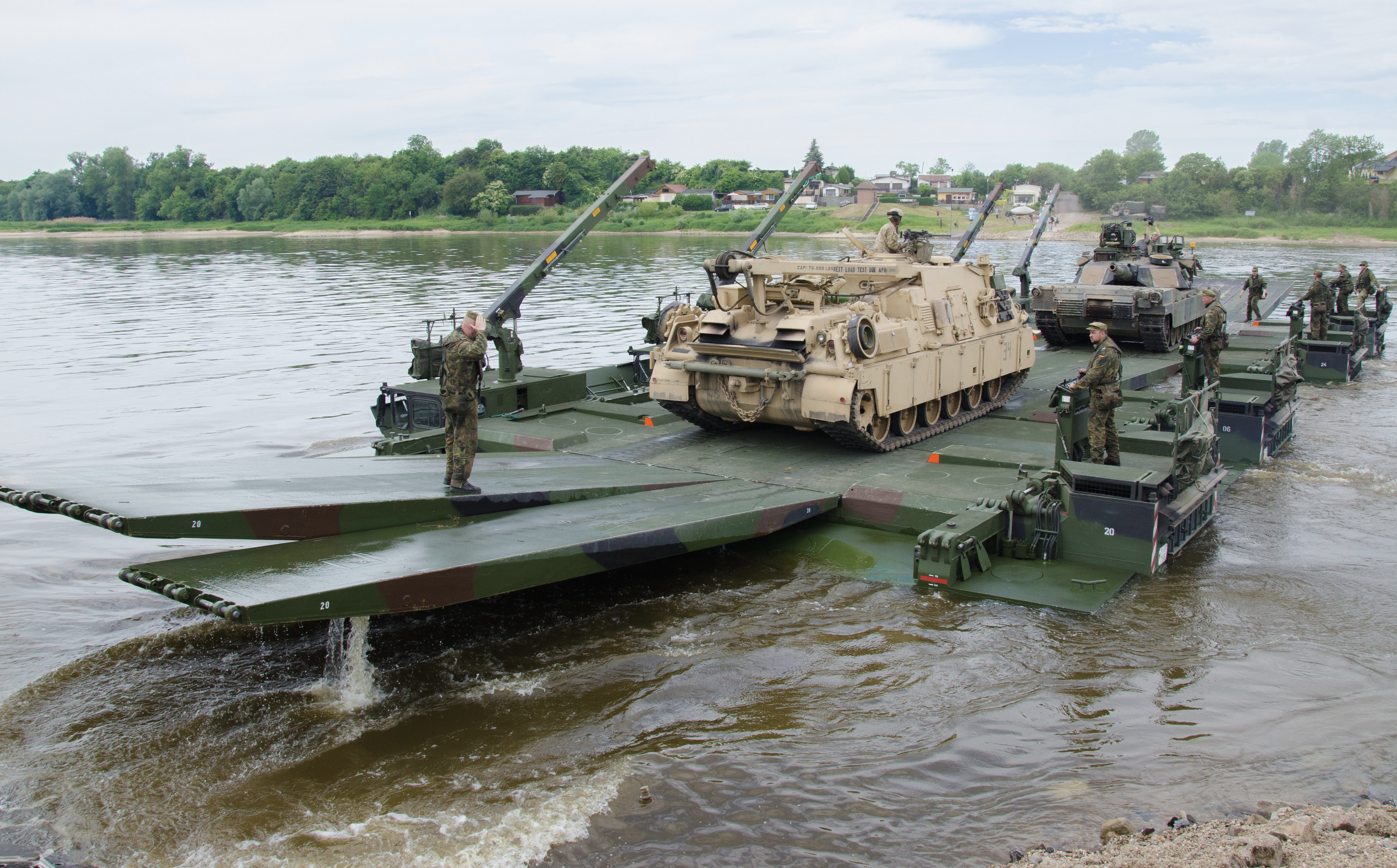
German M3 amphibious bridging vehicles, 2015

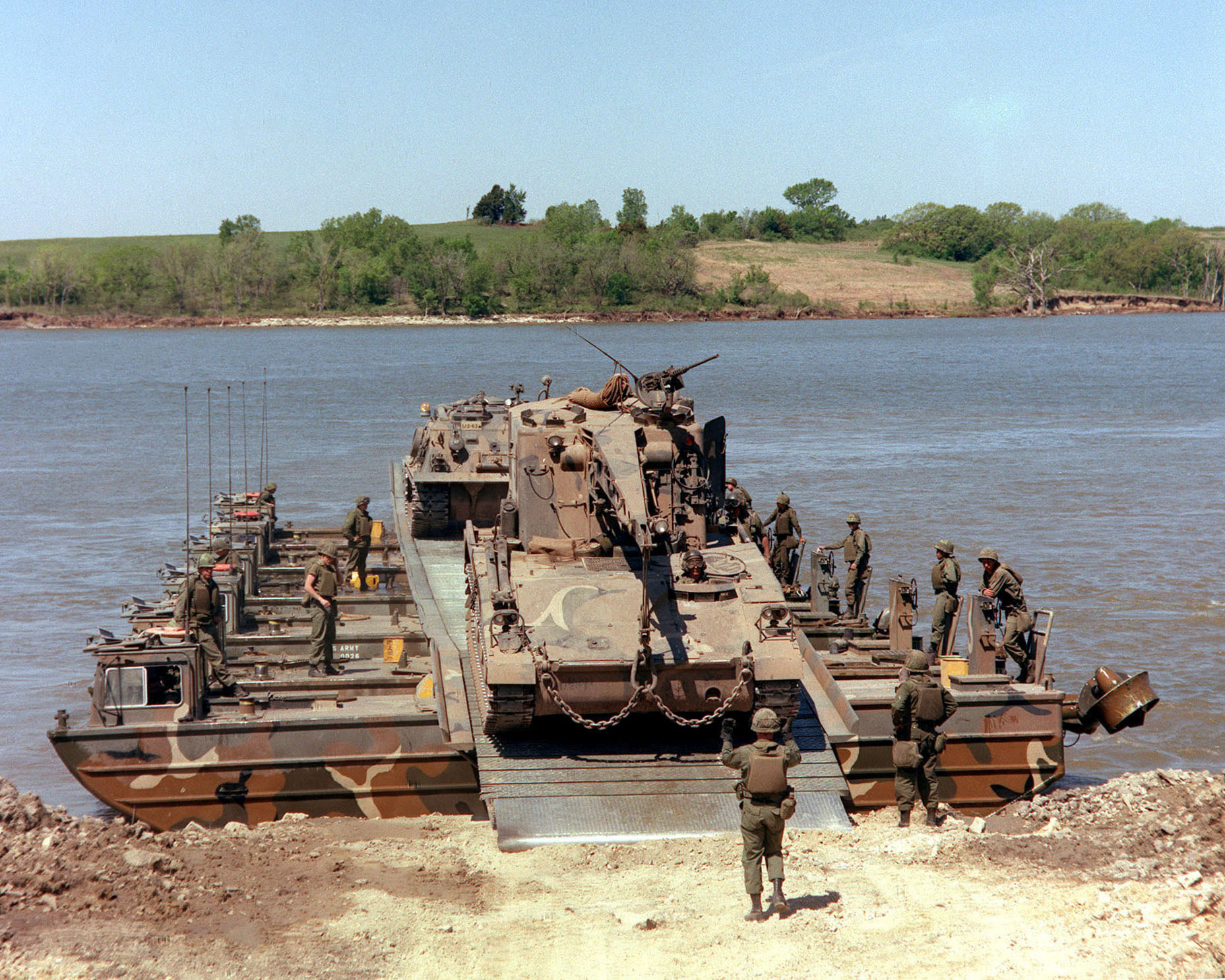
Mobile floating assault bridge–ferry, 1980

Deployment showing automatic unfolding of the most recent Russian ribbon bridge system PP-2005 in 2020

=== Ribbon float bridges ===
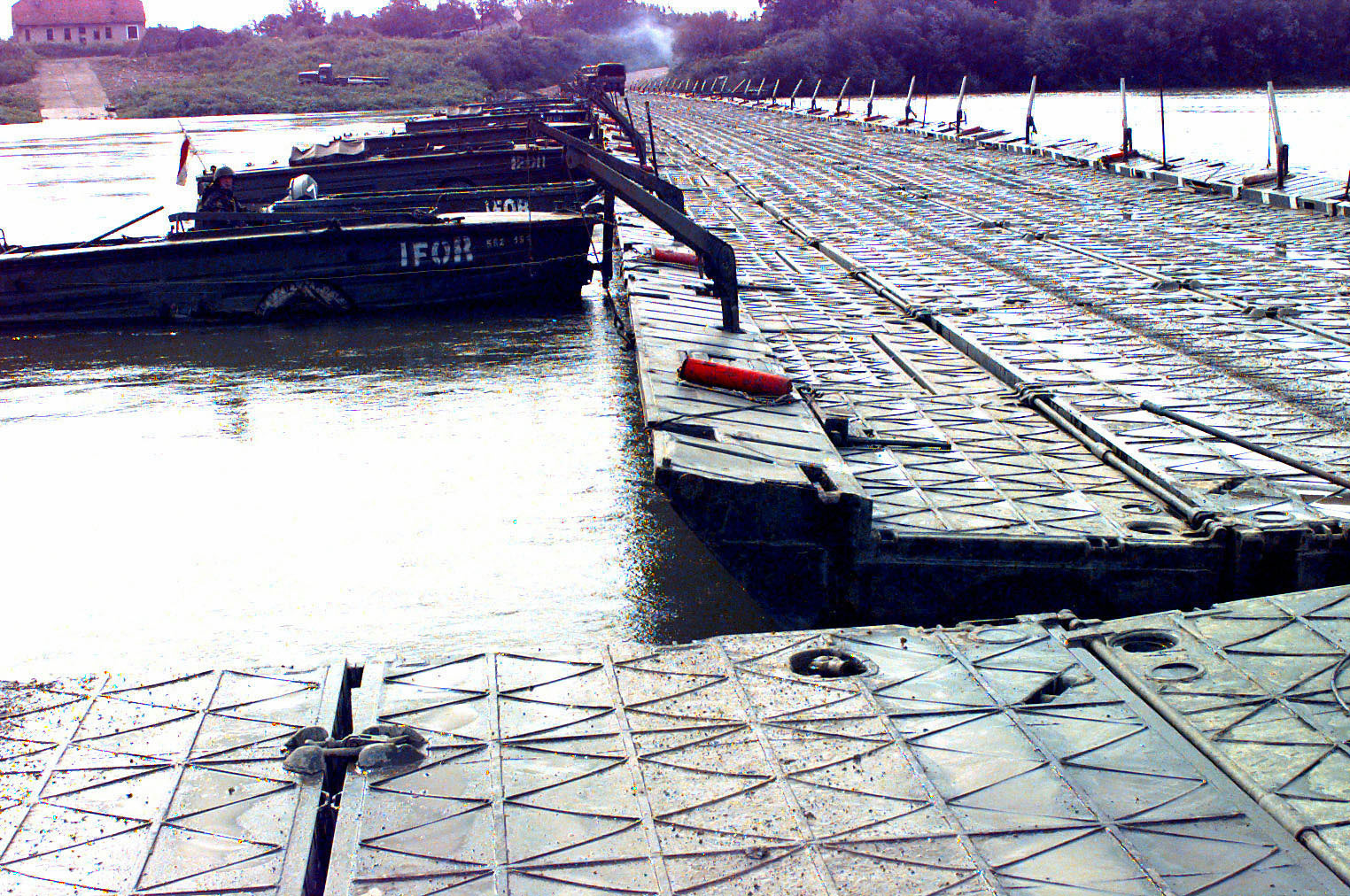
PMP folding float bridge, 1996

In the early Cold War period the Soviet Red Army began development of a new kind of continuous pontoon bridge made up of short folding sections or bays that could be transported and deployed rapidly, automatically unfold in the water, and quickly be assembled into a floating bridge of variable length. Known as the PMP Folding Float Bridge, it was first deployed in 1962 and subsequently adopted by Warsaw Pact countries and other states employing Soviet military equipment. The PMP proved its viability in combat when it was used by Egyptian forces to cross the Suez Canal in 1973. Operation Badr, which opened the Yom Kippur War between Egypt and Israel, involved the erection of at least 10 pontoon bridges to cross the Canal.

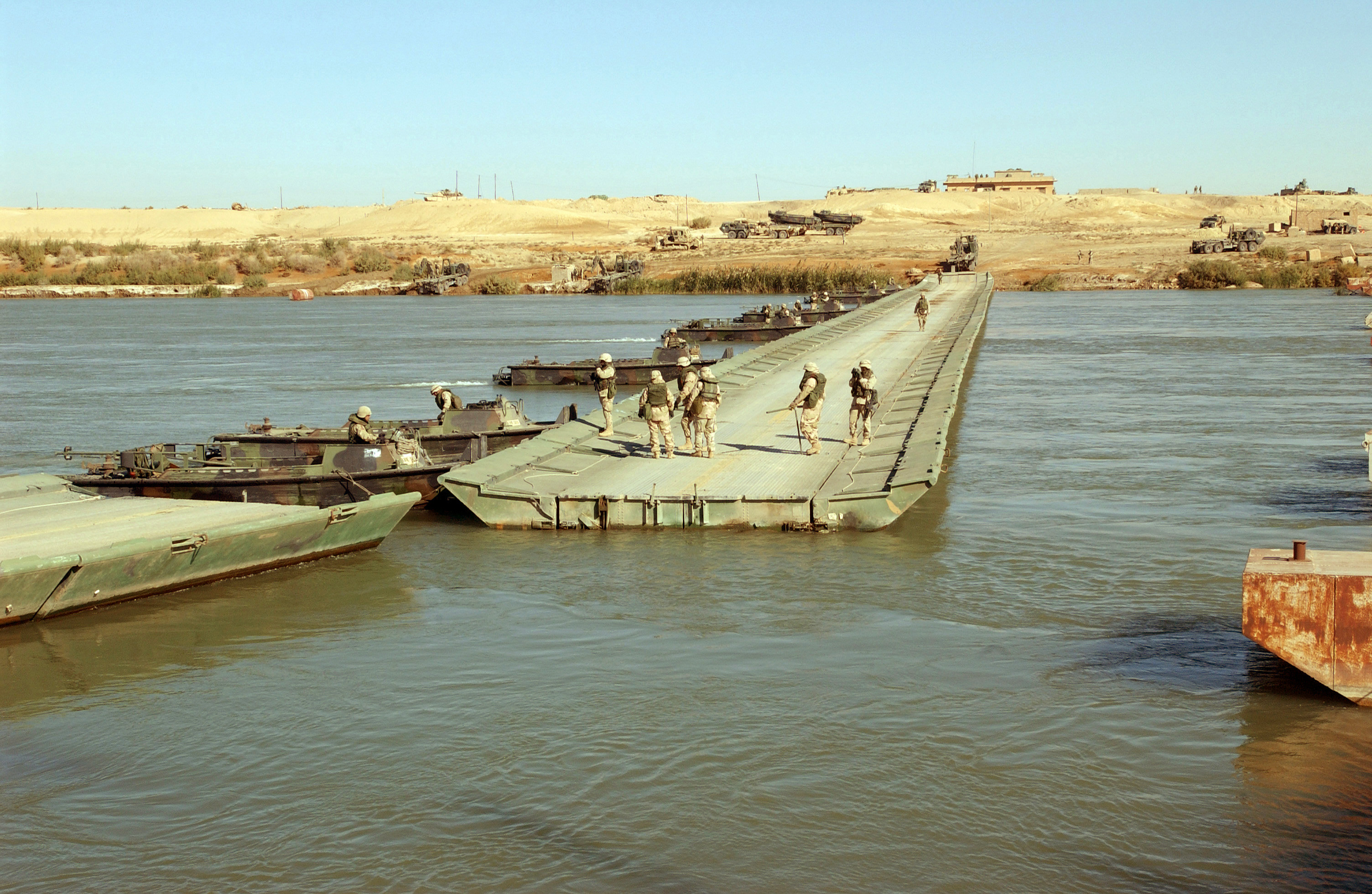
Standard ribbon bridge, 2004

Beginning in 1969, the U.S. Army Mobility Equipment Research and Development Command (MERADCOM) reverse-engineered the Russian PMP design to develop the improved float bridge (IFB), later known as the standard ribbon bridge (SRB). The IFB/SRB was type classified in 1972 and first deployed in service in 1976. It was very similar to the PMP but was constructed of lightweight aluminum instead of heavier steel.

In 1977, the West German Bundeswehr decided to adopt the SRB with some modifications and improvements, entering service in 1979 as the Faltschwimmbrücke, or Foldable Floating Bridge (FSB). Work on designing an improved version of the U.S. SRB incorporating features of the German FSB began in the 1990s, with first deployment by the U.S. Army in the early 2000s as the improved ribbon bridge (IRB).

In addition to the U.S. and Germany, the IFB/SRB/FSB/IRB has been adopted by the Armed Forces of Australia, Brazil, Canada, the Netherlands, Portugal, South Korea and Sweden, among others.

=== Yugoslav wars ===
During the Yugoslav wars of the 1990s, the Maslenica Bridge was destroyed and a short pontoon bridge was built by Croatian civilian and military authorities in July 1993 over a narrow sea outlet in the town of Maslenica, after the territory was retaken from Serbian Krajina. Between 1993 and 1995 the pontoon served as one of the two operational land links toward Dalmatia and Croat- and Bosnian Muslim-held areas of Bosnia-Herzegovina that did not go through Serb-held territory.

In 1995, the 502nd and 38th Engineer Companies of the U.S. Army's 130th Engineer Brigade, and the 586th Engineer Company from Ft. Benning GA, operating as part of IFOR assembled a standard ribbon bridge under adverse weather conditions across the Sava River near Županja (between Croatia and Bosnia), with a total length of 2,034 feet (620 m). It was dismantled in 1996.

=== Iran–Iraq war ===
Numerous pontoon bridges were constructed by the Iranians and Iraqis to cross the various rivers and marshes alongside the Iraqi border. Notable instances include one constructed over the Karkheh river to ambush Iraqi Armor during Operation Nasr, and another where they crossed certain marshes during Operation Dawn 8. They were extremely prominent due to their use in allowing for tanks and transports to cross rivers.

=== Invasion of Iraq ===
Improved ribbon bridge built by 341st Engineer General Service Regiment at Drawsko Pomorskie training area, 11 June 2018

The United States Army's 299th Multi-role Bridge Company, USAR deployed a standard ribbon bridge across the Euphrates river at Objective Peach near Al Musayib on the night of 3 April 2003. The 185-meter bridge was built to support retrograde operations because of the heavy-armor traffic crossing a partially destroyed adjacent highway span.

"By dawn on 4 April 2003, the 299th Engineer Company had emplaced a 185-meter long Assault Float Bridge—the first time in history that a bridge of its type was built in combat." This took place during the 2003 invasion of Iraq by American and British forces. That same night, the 299th also constructed a 40-metre (130 ft) single-story Medium Girder Bridge to patch the damage done to the highway span. The 299th was part of the U.S. Army's 3rd Infantry Division as they crossed the border into Iraq on 20 March 2003.

=== Syrian civil war ===
In February 2018, pro-regime fighters used a pontoon bridge to cross the Euphrates river during the Battle of Khasham.

=== Eastern Ukraine offensive ===
In May 2022, Ukrainian forces repelled an attempted Russian military crossing of the Donets river, west of Sievierodonetsk in Luhansk Oblast, during the Eastern Ukraine offensive. At least one Russian battalion tactical group was reportedly destroyed, as well as the pontoon bridge deployed in the crossing.

== Permanent pontoon bridges in civilian use ==
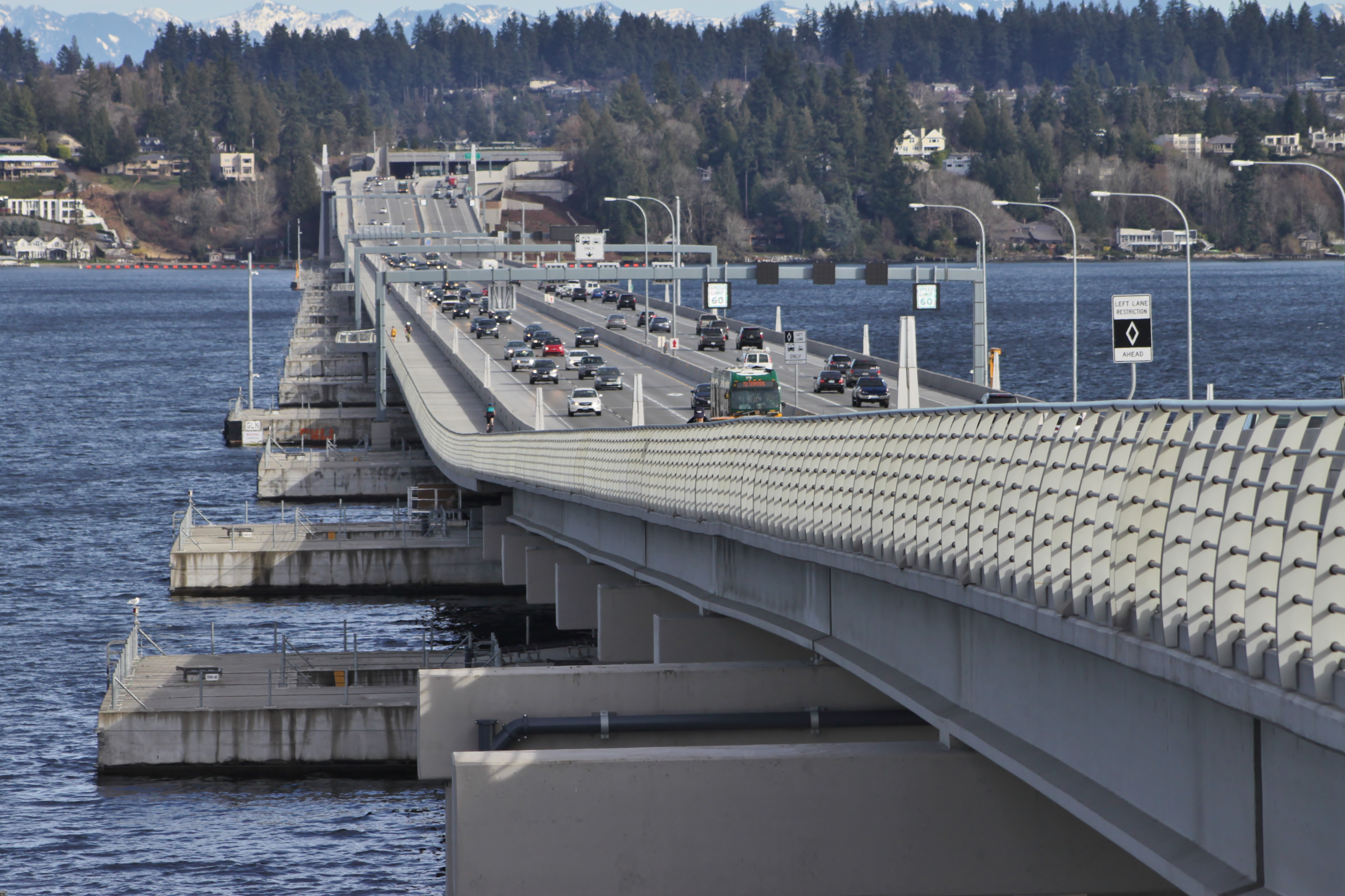
The Evergreen Point Floating Bridge, the world's longest permanent floating bridge, crosses Lake Washington east of Seattle

This design for bridges is also used for permanent bridges designed for highway traffic, pedestrian traffic and bicycles, with sections for boats to ply the waterway being crossed. Seattle, Washington, United States and Kelowna, British Columbia, Canada are two places with permanent pontoon bridges. Namely, these are the William R. Bennett Bridge in British Columbia and three in Seattle: Lacey V. Murrow Memorial Bridge, Evergreen Point Floating Bridge, and Homer M. Hadley Memorial Bridge. Upon the 2026 2 Line "crosslake connection", the last is now the first permanent floating bridge to carry a light rail passenger service. Another floating bridge, the Hood Canal Bridge, crosses the tidal Hood Canal arm of Puget Sound, connecting the Olympic and Kitsap Peninsulas. A single seasonal floating bridge crosses Sunset lake in Brookfield, Vermont, which holds landmark status within the state and is the only confirmed instance of a pontoon-supported permanent road bridge east of the Mississippi River. There are five pontoon bridges across the Suez Canal. Nordhordland Bridge is a combined cable-stayed and pontoon highway bridge in Norway.

== Failures and disasters ==
The Saint Isaac's Bridge across the Neva River in Saint Petersburg suffered two disasters, one natural, a gale in 1733, and then a fire in 1916.

Floating bridges can be vulnerable to inclement weather, especially strong winds. The U.S. state of Washington is home to some of the longest permanent floating bridges in the world, and two of these failed in part due to strong winds.

In 1979, the longest floating bridge crossing salt water, the Hood Canal Bridge, was subjected to winds of 80 miles per hour (130 km/h), gusting up to 120 miles per hour (190 km/h). Waves of 10–15 feet (3.0–4.6 m) battered the sides of the bridge, and within a few hours the western 3/4 mile (1.2 km) of the structure had sunk. It has since been rebuilt.

In 1990, the 1940 Lacey V. Murrow Memorial Bridge was closed for renovations. Specifically, the sidewalks were being removed to widen the traffic lanes to the standards mandated by the Interstate Highway System. Engineers realized that jackhammers could not be employed to remove the sidewalks without risking compromising the structural integrity of the entire bridge. As such, a unique process called hydrodemolition was employed, in which powerful jets of water are used to blast away concrete, bit by bit. The water used in this process was temporarily stored in the hollow chambers in the pontoons of the bridge in order to prevent it from contaminating the lake. During a week of rain and strong winds, the watertight doors were not closed and the pontoons filled with water from the storm, in addition to the water from the hydrodemolition. The inundated bridge broke apart and sank. The bridge was rebuilt in 1993.

A minor disaster occurs if anchors or connections between the pontoon bridge segments fail. This may happen because of overloading, extreme weather or flood. The bridge disintegrates and parts of it start to float away. Many cases are known. When the Lacey V. Murrow Memorial Bridge sank, it severed the anchor cables of the bridge parallel to it. A powerful tugboat pulled on that bridge against the wind during a subsequent storm, and prevented further damage.

On 17 November 2026 a pontoon bridge in Caposile, within the municipality of Musile di Piave near Venice (Italy) collapsed when a gravel truck drove across it, exceeded the bridge's posted 2.5-tonne weight limit.

== See also ==
- Floating dock
- List of pontoon bridges
- Mabey Logistic Support Bridge bailey type bridge that can be made into a multi-span bridge on pontoons
- Military bridges
- Medium Girder Bridge for another bridge type with mobile military application.
- Mulberry Harbour – as used at D-Day
- Okanagan Lake Bridge
  - William R. Bennett Bridge
- 549th Engineer Light Ponton Company
- Vlotbrug, a design of retractable pontoon bridge specific to the Netherlands
