= Mandrocles =

Mandrocles was an ancient Greek engineer from Samos who built a pontoon bridge over the Bosporus for King Darius I to conquer Thrace. Mandrocles dedicated a painting, depicting the bridging of the straits, to the goddess Hera in the Heraion of Samos, commemorating his achievement.
