= Chungmusa (Gogeumdo) =

Shrine in South Jeolla, South Korea

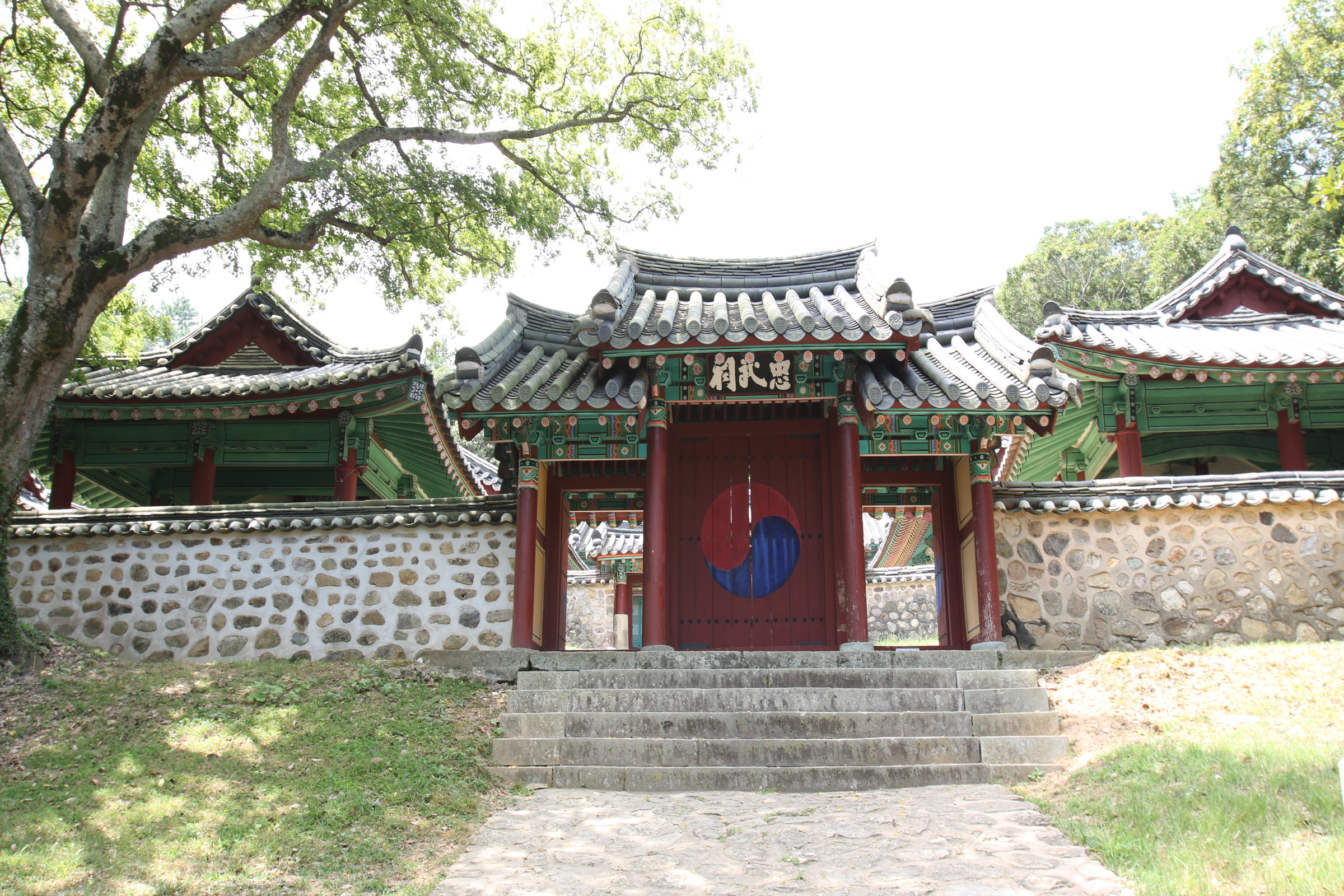
Chungmusa

Chungmusa is a shrine located in Gogeum-myeon, Wando County, South Jeolla Province, South Korea, built to remember the spirit of Admiral Yi Sun-sin. Chungmusa on Gogeum continues to hold a memorial service every year on April 28, the admiral’s birthday, and mark his patriotic fall on November 19.

== History ==
The main building of Chungmusa was first built as ‘the Tomb of Guan Yu’ in the 31st year of Seonjo of Joseon reign (1598) by a Ming dynasty admiral to enshrine and pay homage to Guan Yu, the Chinese dynasty’s war god, and wish for a victory in the war.

In the 7th year of Hyeonjong of Joseon reign (1666), Yu Bi-yeon as the new commanding general of Western Jeolla Province Naval Command expanded it and built Okcheonsa Temple beside the Tomb of Guan Yu for memorial service.

In the 9th year of Sukjong of Joseon reign (1686), a new shrine was built west of the Tomb of Guan Yu to commemorate Admiral Yi Sun-sin, and the whole compound came to enshrine three persons, Guan Yu and Chen Lin in the eastern building and Yi Sun-sin in the western building.

During Hyeonjong of Joseon reign, the officials of the six counties or prefectures of Yeongam, Gangjin, Boseong, and Haenam conducted memorial services on two annual occasions of Gyeongchib and Sanggang.

In the 15th year of his reign (1791), Jeongjo of Joseon granted a plaque of ‘Tanbomyo’ in his handwriting, when the shrine also began to honor Ming’s Admiral Deng Zilong who was killed in the battle of Noryang. As a 70-year-old deputy of Chen Lin, Deng Zilong met a valiant death in the same battle in which Admiral Yi Sun-sin fought alongside.

During the Period of Japanese Occupation, the entire paraphernalia of artifices (armor, books, murals, and plaques) including the statue of Guan Yu and memorial tablets were thrown into the sea according to the policy that intended to suppress the national spirit, while the Buddha statue of Okcheonsa Temple alone was moved to Baegunsa Temple where it was kept.

In 1945 after the national liberation, the Korean Confucianism of Gogeumdo led the effort to rebuild the shrine on the old site of the Tomb of Guan Yu and changed the plaque to Chungmusa, thus honoring Admiral Yi Sun-sin in its main hall.

In 1959, Jo Bangjang, Admiral Yi’s adjutant, and Yi Yeong-nam, then an officer in charge of Garipo, were honored in the eastern building, and services have since been held every year on Admiral Yi Sun-sin’s Anniversary on April 28 and his death on November 19 (on lunar calendar).

== See also ==
- Naval history of Korea
- Japanese invasions of Korea (1592–98)
- Turtle ship
- Yi Sun-sin
