= Deng Zilong =

Chinese general (1531–1598)

Deng Zilong (Chinese: 鄧子龍, 1531–1598) was a military commander for Ming dynasty China. His courtesy name was "Wuqiao" (武橋) and his nickname was the "Tiger Crown Taoist" (虎冠道士). He was born in the Dengjia (Deng family) village of Jiangxi province. He was most famously remembered for part taking in the Imjin War's final showdown, the Battle of Noryang, where he was killed alongside Korean war hero Yi Sun-Sin.

Deng first rose to prominence while subduing a rebellion within his home province during the reign of the Jiajing Emperor. After that, he was assigned to a command post in Guangdong province.

His most notable accomplishment in his military career was his efforts against the Burmese armies of the Taungoo dynasty during the reign of the Burmese king Nanda Bayin, who had repeatedly harassed the Southwestern borders of the Ming dynasty during the 1580s-90s. Deng's forces were often unruly, and gotten into incidents where they had brawls against other Ming forces and among each other. He was relieved of his position in 1583, before being reinstated some 7 years after that, though he continued to run into troop discipline problems and was fired and reinstated several times during his career.

In 1598, he was called upon to join the Ming efforts in Korea, and was given the title of vice admiral of the Ming navy. He took part in the Battle of Noryang at an elderly age, and was killed in action alongside Korean Admiral Yi Sun-Sin. The Korean court honored him greatly after the war, building temples in his name in Korea.
