= Chromatography detector =

Detector for separated compounds from a chromatographic column

A chromatography detector is a device that detects and quantifies separated compounds as they elute from the chromatographic column. These detectors are integral to various chromatographic techniques, such as gas chromatography, liquid chromatography, and high-performance liquid chromatography, and supercritical fluid chromatography among others. The main function of a chromatography detector is to translate the physical or chemical properties of the analyte molecules into measurable signal, typically electrical signal, that can be displayed as a function of time in a graphical presentation, called a chromatograms. Chromatograms can provide valuable information about the composition and concentration of the components in the sample.

Detectors operate based on specific principles, including optical, electrochemical, thermal conductivity, fluorescence, mass spectrometry, and more. Each type of detector has its unique capabilities and is suitable for specific applications, depending on the nature of the analytes and the sensitivity and selectivity required for the analysis.

There are two general types of detectors: destructive and non-destructive. The destructive detectors perform continuous transformation of the column effluent (burning, evaporation or mixing with reagents) with subsequent measurement of some physical property of the resulting material (plasma, aerosol or reaction mixture). The non-destructive detectors are directly measuring some property of the column eluent (for example, ultraviolet absorption) and thus affords greater analyte recovery.

== Destructive detectors ==
In liquid chromatography:

- Charged aerosol detector electrically charged aerosol is used for the detection of non-UV-absorbing chargeable molecules, especially saccharides and lipids
- Evaporative light scattering detector evaporating non volatile solutes inside a volatile mobile phase for universal detection. used for saccharides and lipids and other non-UV-absorbing molecules

In gas chromatography:

- Flame ionization detector which uses ionizing flame to detect most hydrocarbon molecules
- Flame photometric detector which uses atomizing flame to get light emitted from specific elements to detect and quantify them
- Nitrogen Phosphorus Detector a thermionic detector with photometeric detection, sensitive specifically to nitrogen and phosphorus hydrocarbons
- Atomic-emission detector is a hyphenation between gas chromatography and atomic emission spectrophotometer for detection of elements.

In all types of chromatography:

- Mass spectrometer is in fact hyphenation between the separative instrument and a mass spectrometry instrument to get information on the molecular weight or atomic weight of the solute. In the advanced mass spectrometry technologies there is information on solutes structure and even chemical properties. The hyphenation between ultra high performance chromatography with high resolution mass spectrometers revolutionalized entire new scientific fields of research and application, such as toxicology, proteomics, lipidomics, genomics, metabolomics and metabonomics.

== Non-destructive detectors ==
Non-destructive detectors in liquid chromatography:

- Ultraviolet light detectors, fixed or variable wavelength, which includes diode array detectors. The ultraviolet light absorption of the effluent is continuously measured at single or multiple wavelengths. These are by far most popular detectors for liquid chromatography.
- Fluorescence detector. Irradiates the effluent with a light of set wavelength and measure the fluorescence of the effluent at a single or multiple wavelength.
- Refractive index detector. Continuously measures the refractive index of the effluent. The lowest sensitivity of all detectors. Often used in size exclusion chromatography for polymer analysis.
- Radio flow detector. Measures radioactivity of the effluent. This detector can be destructive if a scintillation cocktail is continuously added to the effluent.
- Chiral detector continuously measures the optical angle of rotation of the effluent. It is used only when chiral compounds are being analyzed.
- Conductivity monitor. Continuously measures the conductivity of the effluent. Used only when conductive eluents (water or alcohols) are used.

Non-destructive detectors in gas chromatography:

- Thermal conductivity detector: measures the thermal conductivity of the eluent.
- Electron capture detector: the most sensitive detector known. Allows for the detection of organic molecules containing halogen, nitro groups etc.
- Photoionization detector measures the increase in conductivity achieved by ionizing the effluent gas with ultraviolet light radiation.
- Olfactometric detector: assesses the odor activity of the eluent using human assessors.
- Electronic nose detector which mimics human nose is emerging as a modern and advanced version of the olfactory detection is the electronic nose detector.
