= Ammonium acetate =

- Ammonium acetate skeletal formula

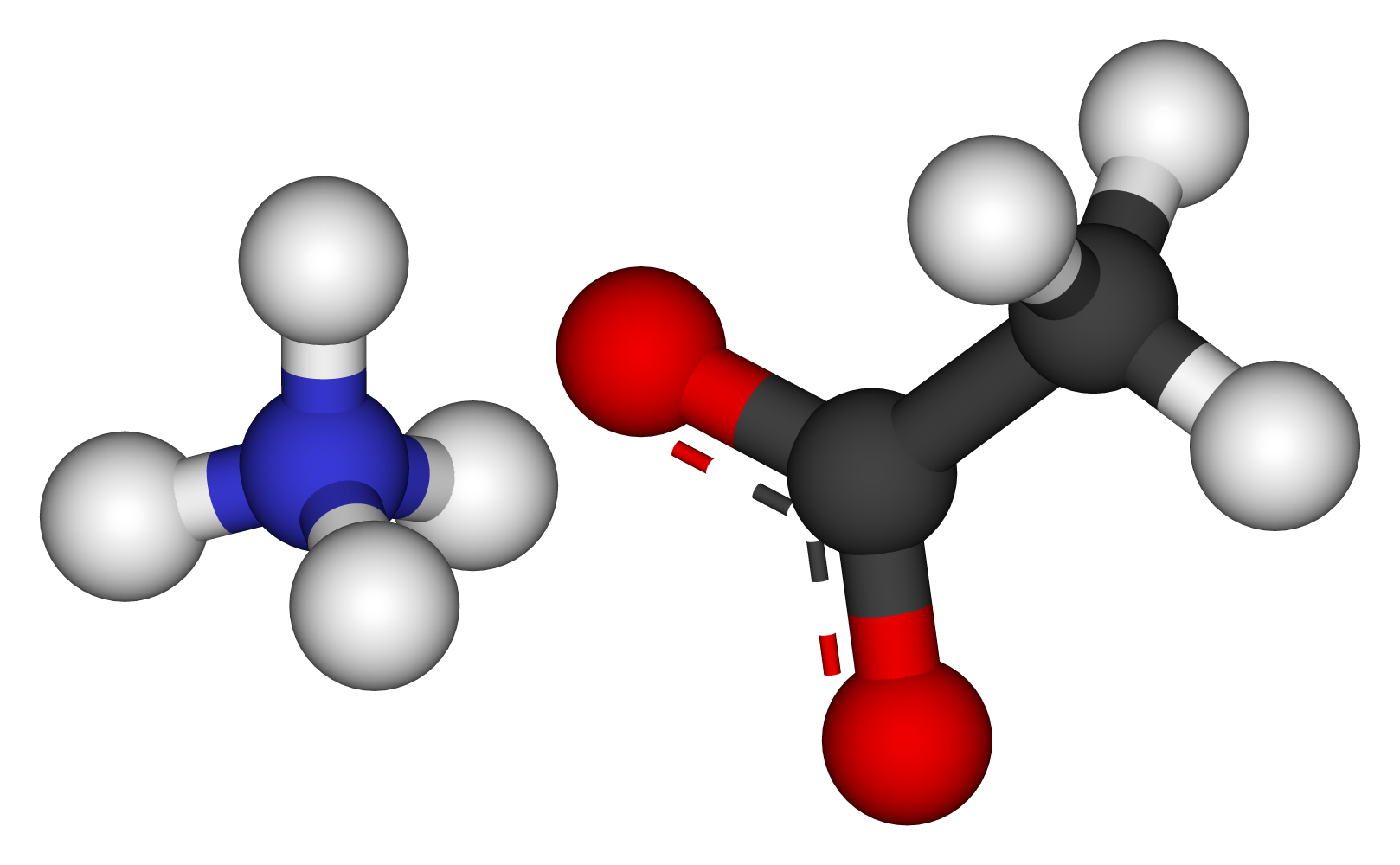
- Ball-and-stick model of ammonium acetate

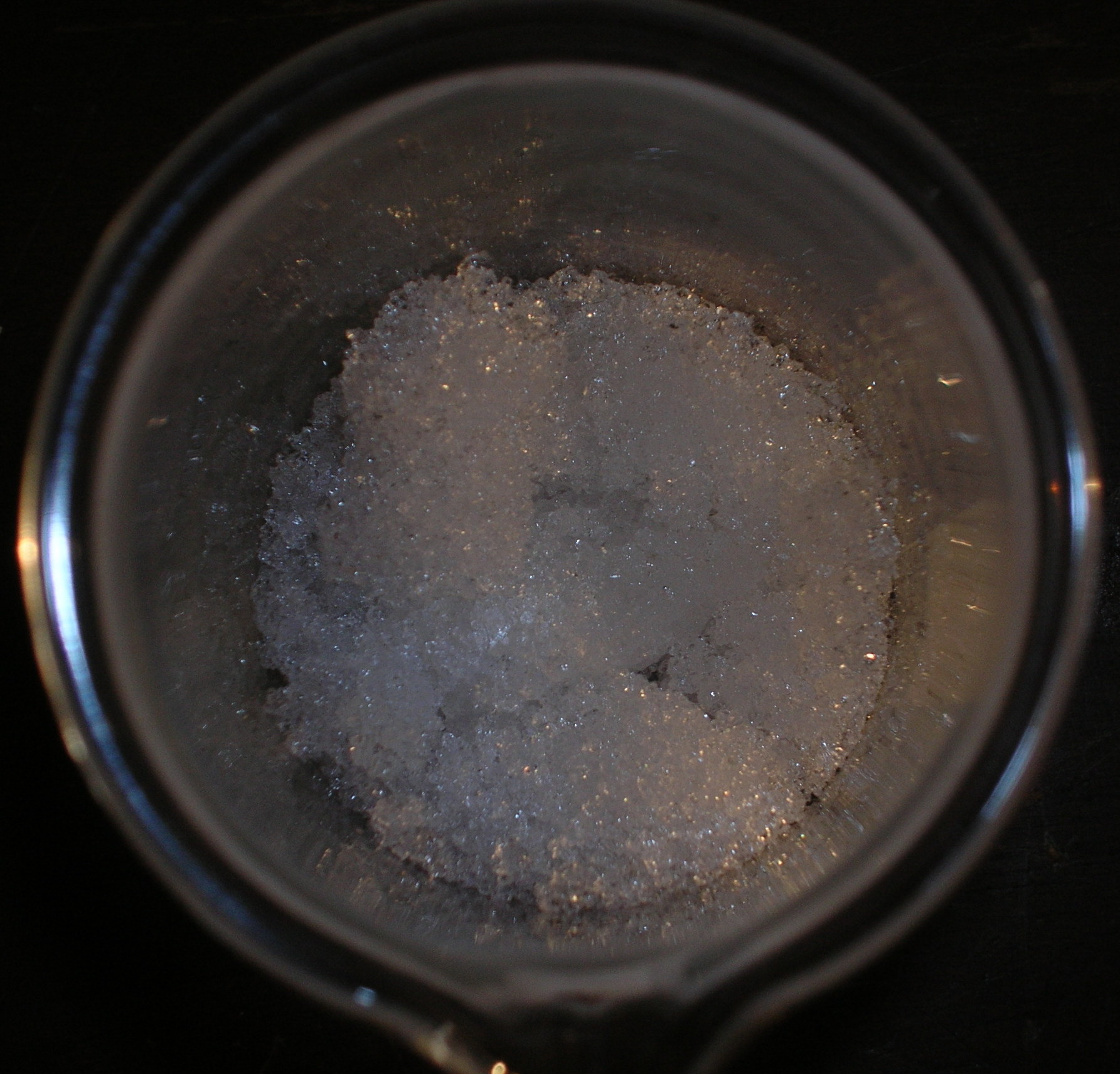
- Crystalline of ammonium acetate

Names
- IUPAC name Ammonium ethanoate

Identifiers
CAS Number	631-61-8
3D model (JSmol)	Interactive image
ChEBI	CHEBI:62947
ChemSpider	11925
ECHA InfoCard	100.010.149
EC Number	211-162-9
PubChem CID	517165
RTECS number	AF3675000
UNII	RRE756S6Q2
UN number	3077
CompTox Dashboard (EPA)	DTXSID5023873
- InChI: InChI=1S/C2H4O2.H3N/c1-2(3)4;/h1H3,(H,3,4);1H3 Key: USFZMSVCRYTOJT-UHFFFAOYSA-N; InChI=1/C2H4O2.H3N/c1-2(3)4;/h1H3,(H,3,4);1H3 Key: USFZMSVCRYTOJT-UHFFFAOYAY
- SMILES: O=C([O-])C.[N+H4]

Properties
Chemical formula	C_{2}H_{7}NO_{2}
Molar mass	77.083 g·mol^{−1}
Appearance	White solid crystals, deliquescent
Odor	Slightly acetic acid like
Density	1.17 g/cm^{3} (20 °C); 1.073 g/cm^{3} (25 °C)
Melting point	113 °C (235 °F; 386 K)
Solubility in water	102 g/100 mL (0 °C); 148 g/100 mL (4 °C); 143 g/100 mL (20 °C); 533 g/100 mL (80 °C)
Solubility	Soluble in alcohol, SO_{2}, acetone, liquid ammonia
Solubility in methanol	7.89 g/100 mL (15 °C); 131.24 g/100 g (94.2 °C)
Solubility in dimethylformamide	0.1 g/100 g
Acidity (pK_{a})	9.9
Basicity (pK_{b})	33
Magnetic susceptibility (χ)	−41.1·10^{−6} cm^{3}/mol
Viscosity	21

Structure
Crystal structure	Orthorhombic

Thermochemistry
Std enthalpy of formation (Δ_{f}H^{⦵}_{298})	−615 kJ/mol

Hazards
- Occupational safety and health (OHS/OSH)
Main hazards	Irritant
- GHS labelling
Pictograms	(GHS07: Exclamation mark)
Signal word	Warning
Hazard statements	H303, H316, H320, H333
Precautionary statements	P281, P335
NFPA 704 (fire diamond)	1 1 1
Flash point	136 °C (277 °F; 409 K)
- Lethal dose or concentration (LD, LC)
LD_{50} (median dose)	386 mg/kg (mice, intravenous)
Safety data sheet (SDS)	JT Baker
- Except where otherwise noted, data are given for materials in their standard state (at 25 °C [77 °F], 100 kPa). verify (what is ?) Infobox references

Ammonium acetate, also known as spirit of Mindererus in aqueous solution, is a chemical compound with the formula NH_{4}CH_{3}CO_{2}. It is a white, hygroscopic solid and can be derived from the reaction of ammonia and acetic acid. It is available commercially.

== History ==
The synonym Spirit of Mindererus is named after R. Minderer, a physician from Augsburg.

== Uses ==
It is the main precursor to acetamide:

NH_{4}CH_{3}CO_{2} → CH_{3}C(O)NH_{2} + H_{2}O

It is also used as a diuretic.

=== Buffer ===
As the salt of a weak base (ammonium) and a weak acid (acetic acid), is often used to create a buffer solution. Ammonium acetate is volatile at low pressures. Because of this, it has been used to replace cell buffers that contain non-volatile salts in preparing samples for mass spectrometry. It is also popular as a buffer for mobile phases for HPLC with ELSD and CAD-based detection for this reason. Other volatile salts that have been used for this include ammonium formate.

When dissolving ammonium acetate in pure water, the resulting solution typically has a pH of 7, because the equal amounts of acetate and ammonium neutralize each other. However, ammonium acetate is a dual component buffer system, which buffers around pH 4.75 ± 1 (acetate) and pH 9.25 ± 1 (ammonium), but it has no significant buffer capacity at pH 7, contrary to common misconception.

=== Other ===
- a biodegradable de-icing agent.
- a catalyst in the Knoevenagel condensation and as a source of ammonia in the Borch reaction in organic synthesis.
- a protein precipitating reagent in dialysis to remove contaminants via diffusion.
- a reagent in agricultural chemistry for determination of soil CEC (cation exchange capacity) and determination of available potassium in soil wherein the ammonium ion acts as a replacement cation for potassium.
- part of Calley's method for lead artifact conservation

=== Food additive ===
Ammonium acetate is also used as a food additive as an acidity regulator; INS number 264. It is approved for usage in Australia and New Zealand.

== Production ==
Ammonium acetate is produced by the neutralization of acetic acid with ammonium carbonate or by saturating glacial acetic acid with ammonia. Obtaining crystalline ammonium acetate is difficult on account of its hygroscopic nature.
