= Hydrophilic interaction chromatography =

Type of chromatography

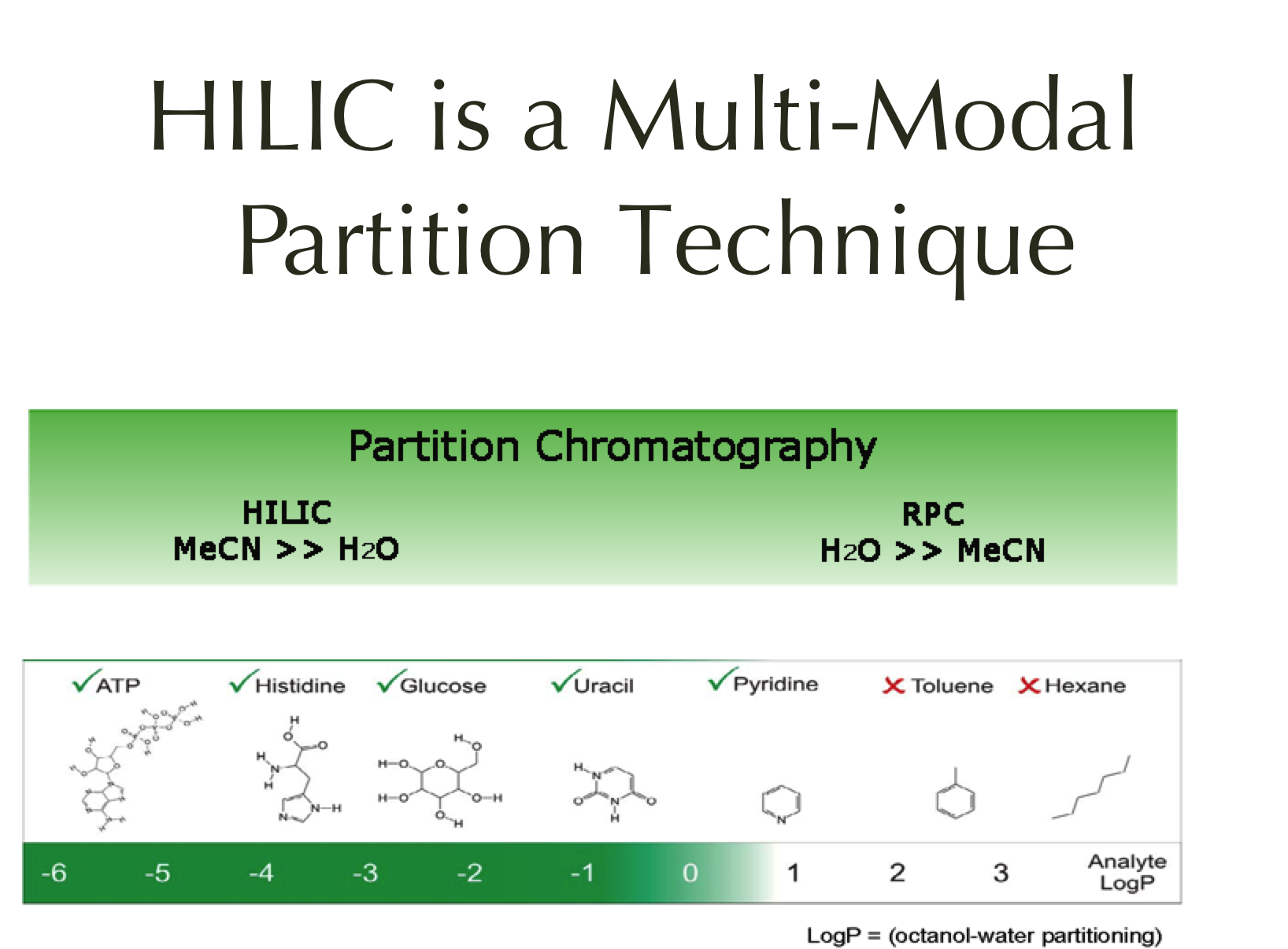
Analyte's separated by HILIC vs Reverse phase Chromatography (RPC), using increasingly organic and aqueous mobile phases respectively. Analytes organized by lipophilicity.

Hydrophilic interaction chromatography (or hydrophilic interaction liquid chromatography, HILIC) is a type of liquid chromatography that uses a hydrophilic stationary phase and a high-organic mobile phase for the separation of analytes by polarity. While it is not as popular as some other types of liquid chromatography, the number of scientific publications using HILIC have greatly increased since the early 2000s. HILIC is similar to reverse phase chromatography in its mobile phase composition, and also to normal phase chromatography, with its polar stationary phase. It also has overlap with ion exchange chromatography. Sometimes, HILIC is considered to be a hybrid of these techniques.

HILIC was named in 1990 by Andrew Alpert, who described it as a type of liquid-liquid partition chromatography. He suggested that analytes elute in order of increasing polarity, a conclusion supported by review and re-evaluation of published data. The mechanism for HILIC is still not entirely understood, but it is thought to rely on analytes partitioning between the organic-rich mobile phase and a water-enriched layer that forms of the surface of the polar stationary phase, in a liquid-liquid extraction system. More polar analytes will have stronger interactions with the water-enriched layer and with the column itself, therefore being retained on the column for longer.

== Stationary Phase ==
One of the key factors influencing HILIC separations is the chemical nature of the stationary phase that is packed into the column. Stationary phases on HILIC columns not only provide physical support for the water layer which analytes separate into, but also interact with the analytes through hydrogen bonding and electrostatic interactions, affecting their retention and therefore the mechanism of separation.

Typical HILIC stationary phases are polar, made of classical bare silica or silica gels modified with various polar groups. Some commonly used stationary phases include bare silica, or silica chemically bonded to amino-, amide-, cyano-, or diol- groups. Ion exchanger groups, both cationic and anionic, as well as zwitterionic groups are also commonly used.

While most HILIC phases are polar, there have also been exceptions where non-polar bonded silicas are used with extremely high organic solvent composition. In this case, interactions are affected by exposed patches of silica in between the bonded ligands on the support.

== Mobile phase ==
The mobile phase, or the liquid phase that runs across the column during separation, for HILIC is typically composed of a high amount of water-miscible, polar organic solvent and a low amount of water. Typically, acetonitrile ("MeCN", also designated as "ACN") is used for the organic solvent, though other aprotic water-miscible solvents, such as alcohols at higher concentration, tetrahydrofuran, or dioxane, can also be used.

As with other methods of chromatography, the mobile phase can be delivered isocratically or with a gradient starting at high-organic progressing towards increasing aqueous content. If using a mobile phase gradient, the mobile phase will progressively increases in polar-aqueous content, causing increasingly polar analytes to be eluted.

All ions partition into the stationary phase to some degree, so an occasional "wash" with water is required to ensure a reproducible stationary phase.

== Additives ==
Mobile phase pH and electrostatic interactions, as well as analyte polarity, are regulated by the addition of ionic additives. These additives improve separation efficiency, including more symmetric peaks, less peak tailing, and better recovery from the stationary phase. Ammonium acetate and ammonium formate are commonly used, as they have good solubility in high organic.

When considering additive addition, compatibility with detectors is important to consider. HILIC is often used with a mass spectrometry (MS), which cannot handle non-volatile salts like sodium perchlorate, which may suppress ion signal in the instrument, though it may increase mobile phase polarity and assist with elution in HILIC.

== Choice of pH ==
With surface chemistries that are weakly ionic, the choice of pH can affect the ionic nature of the column chemistry. Properly adjusted, the pH can be set to reduce the selectivity toward functional groups with the same charge as the column, or enhance it for oppositely charged functional groups. Similarly, the choice of pH affects the polarity of the solutes. However, for column surface chemistries that are strongly ionic, and thus resistant to pH values in the mid-range of the pH scale (pH 3.5–8.5), these separations will be reflective of the polarity of the analytes alone. When used with mass spectrometry, pH can also affect analyte ionization and thus detection.

== ERLIC ==
ERLIC (electrostatic repulsion interaction chromatography) is a type of HILIC that relies on electrostatic interactions, coined by Alpert in 2008. The ionic stationary phase in ERLIC is chosen to have a similar charge to the analyte(s) so that the analyte is repelled by the stationary phase but also retained by the aqueous layer, allowing for enhanced interaction of the remaining polar, oppositely-charged functional groups of the analyte. Electrostatic effects have an order of magnitude stronger chemical potential than neutral polar effects. These opposing effects can, in some cases, enable isocratic separations, with the mobile phase held constant instead of delivered at a gradient. ERLIC can be used to reduce retention of more polar functional groups and minimize the influence of common ionic groups within a set of analytes.

=== Cationic ERLIC ===
A negatively charged cation exchange column can be used for ERLIC separations to reduce the influence of anionic (negatively charged) groups on analyte retention. For example, reducing the influence the phosphates of nucleotides or of phosphonyl antibiotic mixtures; or sialic acid groups of modified carbohydrates, to allow separation based more on the basic and/or neutral functional groups of these molecules. Modifying the polarity of a weakly ionic group (e.g. carboxyl) on the surface is easily accomplished by adjusting the pH to be within two pH units of that group's pKa. For strongly ionic functional groups of the surface (i.e. sulfates or phosphates), lower amount of buffer can be used so the residual charge is not completely ion paired. An example of this would be the use of a 12.5mM (rather than the recommended >20mM buffer), pH 9.2 mobile phase on a polymeric, zwitterionic, betaine-sulfonate surface to separate phosphonyl antibiotic mixtures (each containing a phosphate group). This enhances the influence of the column's sulfonic acid functional groups over its surface chemistry, slightly diminished (by pH), quaternary amine. These analytes will show a reduced retention on the column eluting earlier, and in higher amounts of organic solvent, than if a neutral polar HILIC surface were used. This also increases their detection sensitivity by negative ion mass spectrometry.

=== Anionic ERLIC ===
Similarly, a positively charged anion exchange column can be used to reduce the influence of cationic (positively charged) functional groups on the retention time of analytes. For example, when selectively isolating phosphorylated peptides or sulfated polysaccharide molecules, use of a pH between 1 and 2 pH units reduces the polarity of two of the three ionizable oxygens of the phosphate group, and thus allows easy desorption from the (oppositely charged) surface chemistry. Negatively charged carboxyl groups in the analyte will be protonated at this low pH, and thus also contribute less to the polarity and therefore separation of the analyte

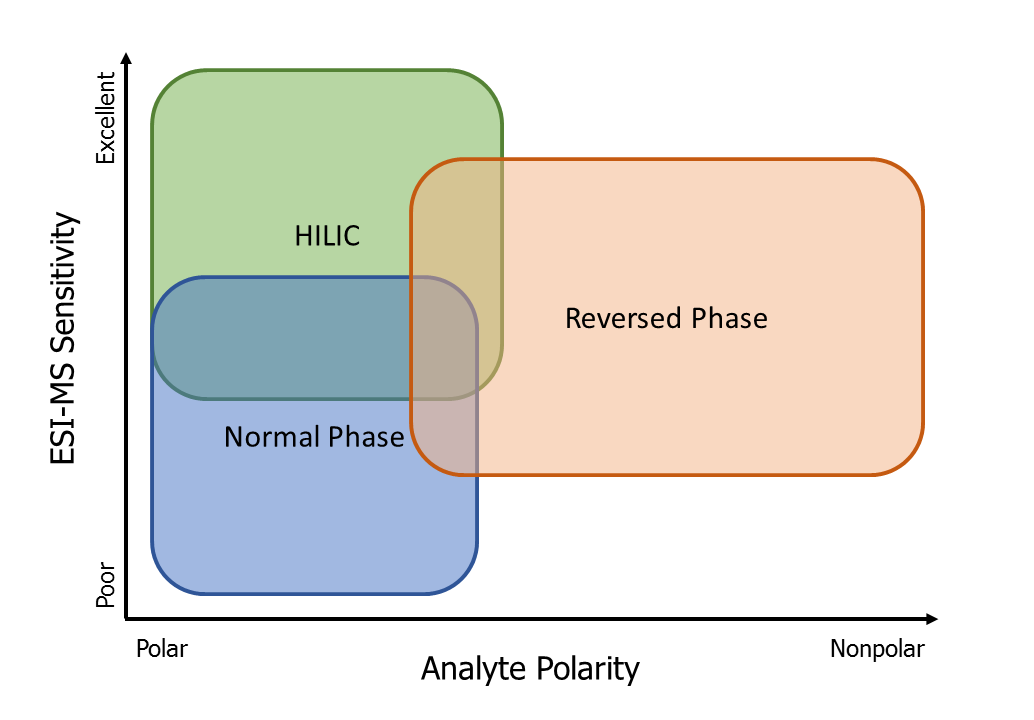
Comparing HILIC, normal phase, and reversed phase chromatography in terms of sensitivity for electrospray ionization mass spectrometry and analyte polarity.

== Applications ==
HILIC can be applied in many fields including proteomics, metabolomics, medical studies, and agricultural/ food studies, among others. It can be used to separate proteins and peptides, nucleosides, amino acids, sacharides, carbohydrates, and other small, polar, ionizable compounds. HILIC is especially common in metabolomic studies, both for targeted and untargeted approaches, given its ability to retain polar analytes that are poorly suited for traditional reverse-phased columns. This separation technique is also particularly suitable for glycosylation analysis and quality assurance of glycoproteins and glycoforms in biologic medical products. For the detection of polar compounds with the use of electrospray-ionization mass spectrometry as a chromatographic detector, HILIC can offer a ten fold increase in sensitivity over reversed-phase chromatography because the organic solvent is much more volatile. HILIC is considered orthogonal reverse phase chromatography, and these two are increasingly being combined in studies for more comprehensive coverage.

== See also ==
- Chromatography
- High performance liquid chromatography
- Liquid chromatography mass spectrometry
- Reversed phase chromatography
- Ion exchange chromatography
- Partition chromatography
