= Field flow fractionation =

Separation technique to characterize the size of colloidal particles

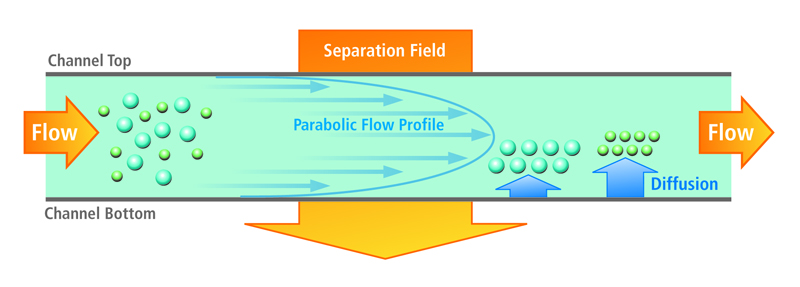
Flow field-flow fractionation (AF4) channel cross section, where the velocity of laminar flow within the channel is not uniform. The fluid travels in a parabolic pattern with the velocity of the flow, increasing with the distance from the walls up towards the centre of the channel. Separation takes place close to the accumulation (bottom) wall of the channel

Field-flow fractionation, abbreviated FFF, is a separation technique invented by J. Calvin Giddings. The technique is based on separation of colloidal or high molecular weight substances in liquid solutions, flowing through the separation platform, which does not have a stationary phase. It is similar to liquid chromatography, as it works on dilute solutions or suspensions of the solute, carried by a flowing eluent. Separation is achieved by applying a field (hydraulic, centrifugal, thermal, electric, magnetic, gravitational, ...) or cross-flow, perpendicular to the direction of transport of the sample, which is pumped through a long and narrow laminar channel. The field exerts a force on the sample components, concentrating them towards one of the channel walls, which is called accumulation wall. The force interacts with a property of the sample, thereby the separation occurs, in other words, the components show differing "mobilities" under the force exerted by the crossing field. As an example, for the hydraulic, or cross-flow FFF method, the property driving separation is the translational diffusion coefficient or the hydrodynamic size. For a thermal field (heating one wall and cooling the other), it is the ratio of the thermal and the translational diffusion coefficient.

== Applications and detection methods ==
FFF is applicable in the sub-micron range (from 1 nm to several microns) in the "normal" mode or up to 50 microns in the so-called steric mode. The transition from normal to steric mode takes place when diffusion becomes negligible at sizes above a micron. FFF is unique in its wide dynamic range of sizes covering both soluble macromolecules and particles or colloids which can be separated in one analysis.

Typical applications are high molar mass polymers and polymer composites, nanoparticles, both industrial and environmental, viruses and virus like particles, lipid nanoparticles, extracellular vesicles and other types of biological samples.

FFF can be coupled to all types of detectors known, from high-performance liquid chromatography (HPLC) to size-exclusion chromatography (SEC). Due to FFF's similarity to liquid chromatography (LC), a liquid mobile phase passing through the channel, the most common detectors are those that are also used for liquid chromatography. The most frequently used is an ultraviolet-visible spectroscopy (UV-VIS) detector, because of its non-destructive nature. Coupling with multi angle light scattering which allows the calculation of the size of eluting fractions and comparison to values obtained via FFF theory. Another popular detector is inductively coupled plasma mass spectrometry to characterize metallic nanoparticles with high specificity and sensitivity.

== Advantages ==
FFF offers a physical separation of complex and inhomogeneous samples, which potentially cannot be characterized by other separation methods, such as size-exclusion chromatography. Because there is no stationary phase, there is less interaction with surfaces or column packing materials. The separation is tunable by modulating the strength of the separation field. FFF is a gentle method and does not exert physical stress on fragile samples, and the carrier solution can be tailored in view of best sample stability. FFF has a well worked-out theory, which can be used to find separation conditions to reach the optimal result, without a series of trial-and-error experiments. It is also possible to extract information of physical parameters of sample fractions from the FFF theory, although almost all users depend mostly on light scattering detectors to measure the size of eluting sample fractions.

== Limitations ==
FFF does not work for small molecules, because of their fast diffusion. For an effective separation, the sample has to be concentrated very close to the accumulation wall (a distance less than 10 μm), which requires the drift velocity caused by the force field to be two orders of magnitude higher compared to the diffusion coefficient. The maximum field strength which can be generated in an FFF channel determines the lower size range of separation. For current instrumentation this is approximately 1 nm.

Although FFF is an extremely versatile technique, there is no "one size fits all" method for all applications. Different FFF methods need specialized instrumentation. Currently only the so-called asymmetric flow field-flow fractionation (AF4) has gained widespread use. Other methods like centrifugal, thermal or electrical FFF still have a niche existence.

FFF behaves differently from column chromatography and can be counter-intuitive for HPLC or SEC users. Understanding of the working principle of FFF is vital for a successful application of the method.

== Discovery and general principles ==
FFF was devised and first published by J. Calvin Giddings in 1966 and in 1976. Giddings had published many articles on flow-FFF which is the most important FFF technique today. Giddings, credited for the invention of FFF, was professor of chemistry and specialist of chromatography and separation techniques at the University of Utah.

The animation illustrates how the separation in FFF is driven by particle diffusion in a parabolical flow profile. Shown are two types of particles; the red ones are smaller than the blue ones. A force is applied from the top (here it is a cross flow used in asymmetrical flow fff). The particles diffuse up against this force. On average the smaller red particles are higher up above the accumulation wall compared to the blue particles. The elution flow in longitudinal direction is shown with the flow arrows indicating the velocity profile. Particles jumping up higher are transported faster compared to others. In the statistical process of many particles and many diffusion steps, the cloud formed by the red, smaller particles, migrates faster and separates from the slower blue particles.

As mentioned above, in field-flow fractionation the field can be hydraulic (with a cross flow through a semi-permeable membrane as the accumulation wall), gravitational, centrifugal, thermal, electrical, or magnetic. In all cases, the separation mechanism is produced by differences in particle mobility under the forces of the field, in a stationary equilibrium with the forces of diffusion: The field induces a downward drift velocity and concentration towards the accumulation wall, the diffusion works against this concentration gradient. After a certain time (called relaxation time) the two forces equilibrate in a stationary equilibrium. This is best visualized as a particle cloud, with all components in constant motion, but with an exponential decrease of the average concentration going away from the accumulation wall up into the channel. The decrease of air pressure going up from sea level has the same exponential decrease which is described in the barometric formula. After relaxation has been achieved, elution starts as the channel flow is activated. In the thin channel (typical height 250 to 350 μm) a parabolic laminar-flow-velocity profile exists, which is characterized by a strong increase of the flow velocity with increasing distance from the accumulation wall. This determines the velocity of a particular particle, based on its equilibrium position from the wall of the channel. Particles closer to the accumulation wall will migrate slower compared to others being higher up. The ratio of the velocity of a species of particle to the average velocity of the fluid is called the retention ratio R. In FFF for efficient separation, R needs to be below 0.2, typical values are in the range of 0.02 to 0.1.

== Theory and method ==
Separation in field flow fractionation takes place in a laminar channel. It is composed of a top and bottom block which are separated by a spacer. The spacer has a cut-out (rectangular or trapezoidal) void, which creates the channel volume as the spacer is sealed between the blocks. Alternatively, the channel can be milled into the top block as a cavity. The channel is engineered in a way to allow the application of the force field, which means that for each FFF method a dedicated channel is needed. The sample is injected in a dilute solution or suspension into the channel and is separated during migration from inlet to outlet as the carrier solution is pumped through the channel. Downstream of the channel outlet one or several detectors are placed which analyze the eluting fractions.

Giddings and co-workers have developed a theory describing the general retention equation which is common to all FFF methods.

=== Relating force (F) to retention time (t_{r}) ===
The relationship between the separative force field and retention time can be derived from first principles. Consider two particle populations within the FFF channel. The cross field drives both particle clouds towards the bottom "accumulation" wall. Opposing this force field is the particles' natural diffusion, or Brownian motion, which produces a counter acting motion. When these two transport processes reach equilibrium the particle concentration c approaches the exponential function of elevation x above the accumulation wall as illustrated in equation (1).

$c = c_0 e^\frac{-x}{\ell}$	1

$\ell$ represents the characteristic elevation of the particle cloud. This relates to the average height that the particle cloud reaches within the channel and only when the value for $\ell$ is different for the particle populations separation will occur. The $\ell$ of each component can be related to the force applied on each individual particle or to the ratio of the diffusion coefficient D and the drift velocity U.

$\ell = \frac{kT}{F} = \frac{D}{U}$	2

k is the Boltzmann constant, T is absolute temperature and F is the force exerted on a single particle by the force field. This shows how the characteristic elevation value is inversely dependent to the force applied. Therefore, F governs the separation process. Hence, by varying the field strength the separation can be controlled to achieve optimal levels.

The velocity V of a cloud of molecules is simply the average velocity of an exponential distribution embedded in a parabolic flow profile.

Retention time, t_{r} can be written as:

$t_r = \frac {L}{V}$	3

Where L is the channel length.

In FFF the retention is usually expressed in terms of the retention ratio, which is the void time t_{0} (emergence of a non retained tracer) divided by the retention time t_{r}. The retention equation then becomes:

$R = \frac {t_0}{t_r} = 6\lambda [\operatorname{coth}(\frac {1}{2\lambda})-2\lambda]$	4

where $\lambda$ is $\ell$ divided by w, the channel thickness or height. Substituting kT/F in place of $\ell$ illustrates the retention ratio with respect to the cross force applied.

$R = 6 \frac {kT}{Fw}[\coth(\frac{Fw}{2kT})-2 \frac{kT}{Fw}]$	5

For an efficient operation the channel thickness value w far exceeds $\ell$. When this is the case the term in the brackets approaches unity. Therefore, equation 5 can be approximated as:

$R = 6\lambda = 6 \frac {kT}{Fw}$	6

Thus t_{r} is roughly proportional to F. The separation of particle bands X and Y, represented by the finite increment ∆t_{r} in their retention times, is achieved only if the force increment ∆F between them is sufficient. A differential in force of only 10^{−16} N is required for this to be the case.

The magnitude of F and ∆F depend on particle properties, field strength and the type of field. This allows for variations and adaptations of the technique. From this basic principle many forms of FFF have evolved varying by the nature of the separative force applied and the range in molecule size to which they are targeted.

== Fractogram ==
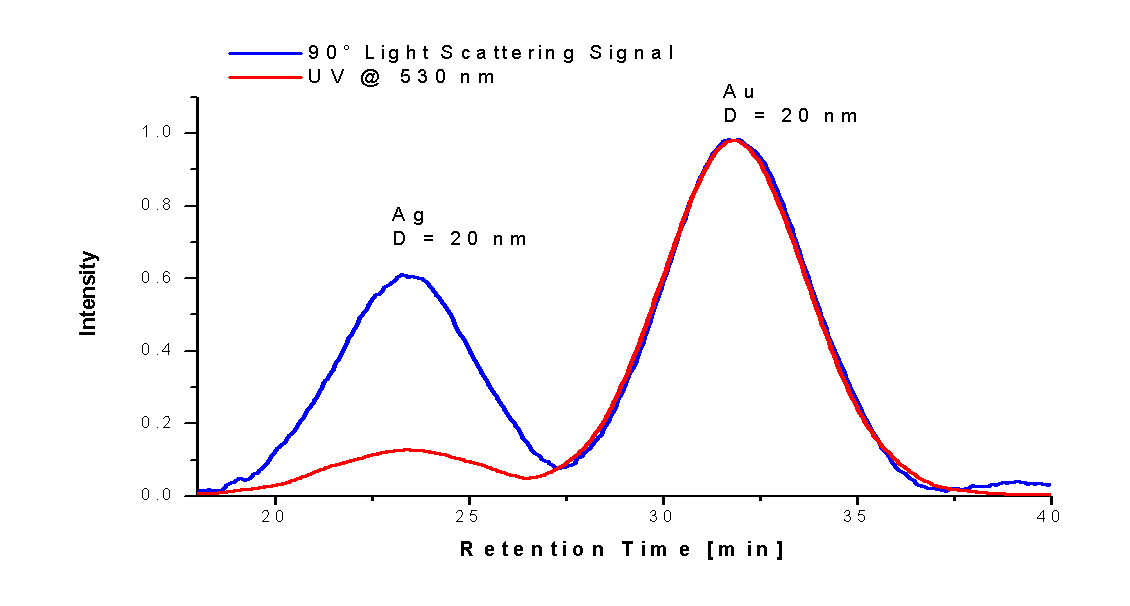
Centrifugal FFF separates by mass (i.e. a combination of particle density and particle size). For example, gold and silver nanoparticles of identical size can be separated into two peaks, according to differences in density of gold and silver.

In FFF the display of detector signals as a function of time is called fractogram, in contrast to the chromatogram of column chromatography techniques. The fractogram can be converted to a distribution plot of one or several physical properties of the analyte using FFF theory and/or detector signals. This can be size, molar mass, charge, etc.

Often these substances are particles initially suspended in a small volume of a liquid buffer and pushed along the FFF channel by the buffer. The varying velocities of a particular species of particles may be due to its size, its mass, and/or its distance from the walls of a channel with non-uniform flow-velocity. The presence of different species in a sample can thus be identified through detection of a common property at some distance down the long channel, and by the resulting fractogram indicating the presence of the various species by peaks, due to the different times of arrival characteristic of each species and its physical and chemical properties.

== Forms ==
Most techniques available today are advances on those originally created by Prof. Giddings nearly 4 decades ago.

=== Symmetrical flow ===
Of these techniques flow FFF was the first to be offered commercially. Flow FFF separates particles based on size, independent of density and can measure macromolecules in the range of 1 nm to 1 μm. In this respect it is the most versatile FFF sub-technique available. The cross flow in Flow FFF enters through a porous frit at the top of the channel, exiting through a semi-permeable membrane outlet frit on the accumulation wall (i.e. the bottom wall). Symmetrical flow has been replaced by asymmetrical flow in the last two decades.

=== Hollow fiber flow ===
Hollow fiber flow FFF (HF5) was developed by Lee et al. (1974). HF5 has been applied towards the analysis of proteins and other macromolecules. HF5 was the first form of flow FFF to be developed in 1974. The advantage is that HF5 offers a disposable channel unit which can be readily replaced in routine applications. One of the drawbacks of HF5 is the limited choice of membrane materials; only polyether sulfone (PES) membranes are available. Currently, HF5 is not widely used, because of the lack of flexibility and limitations in sample load.

=== Asymmetric flow ===
Asymmetric flow FFF (AF4), on the other hand, has only one semi-permeable membrane on the bottom wall of the channel. The cross flow is, therefore, created by the carrier liquid exiting the bottom of the channel. This offers an extremely gentle separation and an “ultra-broad” separation range. The majority of FFF instruments in use are AF4 systems. Main applications are in pharmaceutical research and development for proteins, virus and virus-like particles, and liposomes. AF4 has also been combined with immunoaffinity monolith chromatography for the analysis of plasma-derived extracellular vesicles. CD61-positive platelet-derived vesicles have been isolated using an anti-CD61 monolithic disk and size-fractionated by AF4 coupled with multi-angle and dynamic light-scattering detection. An automated online immunoaffinity chromatography–AF4 system was later used to isolate and fractionate both CD61-positive platelet-derived vesicles and CD9-positive vesicles into size-based subpopulations. The resulting EV fractions were further characterized by Raman spectroscopy and comprehensive two-dimensional gas chromatography. Related AF4 fractionated EV subpopulations were also used in quartz crystal microbalance studies of antibody and ICAM-1 binding.

AF4 can be applied in aqueous and organic solvents, therefore also organic polymers can be separated by this technique. High temperature asymmetric flow field-flow fractionation is available for the separation of high and ultra-high molar mass polymers soluble at temperatures above 150 C.

=== Thermal ===
Thermal FFF, as the name suggests, establishes a separation force by applying a temperature gradient to the channel. The top channel wall is heated and the bottom wall is cooled driving polymers and particles towards the cold wall by thermal diffusion. Thermal FFF was developed as a technique for separating synthetic polymers in organic solvents. Thermal FFF is unique amongst FFF techniques in that it can separate macromolecules by both molar mass and chemical composition, allowing for the separation of polymer fractions with the same molecular weight. Today this technique is ideally suited for the characterization of polymers, gels and nanoparticles.

One of the major advantage of thermal FFF is the simple and very well defined dimensions of the separation channel, which makes the inter-lab or inter-instrument universal calibration possible because the thermal FFF calibration constants closely describe the ratio of ordinary (molecular) diffusion coefficient D to thermal diffusion coefficient (or, thermophoretic mobility) D_{T} which are only polymer dependent. The ThFFF universal calibration is, therefore, instrument and lab transferable, while the well-known size exclusion chromatography universal calibration is polymer-transferable on the same instrument only.

=== Split flow thin-cell fractionation ===
Split flow thin-cell fractionation (SPLITT) is a special preparative FFF technique, using gravity or electric, or diffusion differences for separation of over μm-sized particles on a continuous basis. SPLITT system has two inlets and two outlets. It is performed by pumping the sample immerse in a liquid into one inlet at the start of the channel at low flow-rate, whilst simultaneously pumping a carrier liquid into the second inlet at much higher flow-rate. By controlling the flow rate ratios of the two inlet streams and two outlet streams, the separation can be controlled, and the sample components are separated into two distinct sized fractions. The use of gravity alone as the separating force makes SPLITT the least sensitive FFF technique, limited to particles above 1 μm.

=== Centrifugal ===
In centrifugal FFF, the separation field is generated via a centrifugal force. The channel takes the form of a ring, which spins at rotation speeds which can be programmed during the run. The flow and sample are pumped into the channel and centrifuged, allowing the operator to resolve the particles by mass (size and density). The advantage of centrifugal FFF lies in the high size resolution that can be achieved by varying the force applied, since particle size is proportional to particle mass to the third power.

The unique advantage presented by centrifugal FFF comes from the techniques capability for high resolution given sufficient buoyant density. This allows for the separation of particles with only a 5% difference in size.

Centrifugal FFF has the advantage that particles and macromolecules can be separated by particle density, rather than just particle size. In this instance, two identically sized gold and silver nanoparticles can be separated into two peaks, according to differences in density in the gold and silver nanoparticles,

In AF4 separations, the ratio of mass to time is 1:1. With the addition of the third parameter of density to centrifugal FFF, this produces a ratio more akin to mass:time to the power of three. This results in a significantly larger distinction between peaks and result in a greatly improved resolution. This can be particularly useful for novel products, such as composite materials and coated polymers containing nanoparticles, i.e. particles which may not vary in size but which do vary in density. In this way two identically sized particles can still be separated into two peaks, providing that the density is different.

The limitation of the method lies in the lower limit of size which depends on the density of the sample. Specifically for biological samples, the limit is in the order of 20 to 50 nm in diameter.

=== Electrical ===
In electrical FFF a transverse electrical current (DC) is applied which creates an electric field. Depending on the charge of sample components, an electrophoretic drift velocity is induced, counteracted by the diffusion from Brownian motion, so the separation depends on the ratio of electrophoretic mobility and size. Application of electrical FFF has been limited and is currently rarely used. Other modifications have been developed, namely cyclical electrical FFF where a special alternating current is applied. It allows to separate according to electrophoretic mobility. Another variation is electrical asymmetrical flow FFF (EAF4), where an electrical field is applied in addition to a cross flow field. EAF4 overcomes the limitation of pure electrical FFF which has poor resolution and suffers from electrolysis products and bubbles contaminating the channel outflow and compromising the detector signals.
