= J. Calvin Giddings =

American chemist credited with the invention of field flow fractionation

- Born: September 26, 1930; American Fork, Utah
- Died: October 24, 1996 (aged 66); Salt Lake City, Utah
- Education: Brigham Young University; University of Utah
- Known for: Field flow fractionation
- Awards: William H. Nichols Medal (1991)
- Scientific career
- Fields: Analytical separation
- Workplaces: University of Utah

John Calvin Giddings (September 26, 1930 – October 24, 1996) was a Distinguished Professor of chemistry at the University of Utah. Giddings received a B.S. degree from Brigham Young University in 1952 and a PhD from the University of Utah in 1954. Following postdoctoral work at the University of Utah and the University of Wisconsin, he joined the faculty of the University of Utah as assistant professor of chemistry in 1957. He became associate professor in 1959, research professor in 1962, and professor in 1966. Giddings authored or co-authored more than 400 publications and edited 32 books in the field of chemistry. He was executive editor of the journal Separation Science and Technology, and the editor of the series Advances in chromatography.

Gidding's work in separation sciences shed light on the chromatographic processes, as well as other separation techniques, including non-equilibrium, diffusion & eddy diffusion, pressure changes, flow in paper and thin-layer chromatography, preparative-scale, and programmed-temperature gas chromatography (GC), exclusion chromatography, electrophoresis, and the generation of non-gaussian zones. He developed understanding of the optimization of multicomponent chromatography especially in 2D separations.

His vision of the capabilities of high-pressure chromatographic systems evolved into High Performance Liquid Chromatography (HPLC), by suggesting to reduce particle size of the columns' packing in liquid chromatography. Giddings also envisioned the capabilities of Supercritical fluid chromatography, by developing the theory and ground work of dense gas chromatographic system.

Eventually Prof Giddings invented the one-phase separation technique called "field-flow fractionation" (FFF). He developed the concept of a chromatographic-like system in which retention is established and controlled by an external field rather than by the stationary phase. The FFF system extends the range of chromatography upward to include macromolecules and particles of almost every type and size, from 0.001 to 10 μm and beyond.

He was nominated for a Nobel Prize in 1984 and 1994.

Giddings received numerous honors for his work including American Chemical Society Awards in Chromatography and Electrophoresis, in Analytical Chemistry, and in Separation Science and Technology. He also received the Tswett Medal in Chromatography, and the Nichols Medical from the New York Section of the ACS. On May 27, 1987, Giddings received an honorary doctorate from the faculty of pharmacy at Uppsala University, Sweden

He died of cancer in 1996.

== Selected works ==
- J. Calvin Giddings (1965). Dynamics of Chromatography. Marcel Decker, NY.
- J. Calvin Giddings (1991). Unified Separation Science. John Wiley & Sons, NY.
