= AF4 =

AF4 may refer to:

- AF4/FMR2 family member 1, a human protein
- Asymmetric flow field flow fractionation, a method for polymer characterization
- AF4, an EEG electrode site according to the 10-20 system
