= Asymmetric flow field flow fractionation =

Method for polymer and organic matter characterization

Asymmetrical flow field-flow fractionation (AF4) is most versatile and most widely used sub-technique within the family of field flow fractionation (FFF) methods. AF4 can be used in aqueous and organic solvents and is able to characterize nanoparticles, polymers and proteins. The theory for AF4 was conceived in 1986 and was established in 1987 and first published by Wahlund and Giddings. AF4 is distinct from symmetrical Flow FFF because it contains only one permeable wall so the cross-flow is caused only by the carrier liquid. The cross-flow is induced by the carrier liquid constantly exiting by way of the semi-permeable wall on the bottom of the channel.

Flow channel

== Applications and detection methods ==
Asymmetrical flow field flow fractionation (AF4) is nowadays a common and state-of-the art method for fractionation and separation of macromolecules and particles in a suspension. AF4 is an alternative to HPLC and SEC in cases where column chromatography is not suitable for the analyte. HPLC or SEC would be used for liquid separations for molecules up to 1000 kDa and nanoparticles up to 10 nm. As the size increases above 10 nm, AF4 becomes superior in terms of resolution and recovery.

AF4's applications are flexible for many analytical conditions where a column-based method would be unable to properly separate the desired particles. For macromolecules and nanoparticles AF4 is an alternative method especially when the stationary phase in columns interacts with the sample. AF4 is specifically powerful for inhomogeneous samples where it can separate soluble macromolecules from particles or aggregates.

AF4 and other FFF methods have been extensively used in environmental research on the impact of nano materials and to characterize condensed tannins oxidation.

For high molar mass and branched polymers, AF4 has been shown to achieve good separation, whereas SEC fails, and AF4 has been applied to polyolefines at temperatures above 150 C.

Detection methods are the same as for FFF in general, UV is most popular as a concentration detector, but most AF4 systems include a multi-angle light scattering detector for direct measurement or size and molar mass.

== Operational procedures ==
The AF4 experiment can be separated into three stages:

1. Sample Injection

Samples are injected into the system using a known amount of sample volume. This volume will depend on the AF4 instrument being utilized in the experiment. Starting fractionation immediately after sample injection is not ideal because the sample is going to spread out randomly from the injection site, so the beginning velocity and place of the particles are not all the same. This leads to line broadening and insufficiency. In order to correct such an error, sample focusing is proposed.

2. Sample focusing

A current going opposite of the carrier solvent is used to focus all the particles in the sample to one specified area before fractionation begins. This corrects for any peak broadening that can occur due to particles being dispersed from the injection port to the channel outlet before fractionation begins. Sample preparation is another option that can be achieved in the focus step. Once all the particles are in the same area of the channel, fractionation can occur.

3. Fractionation

There are two components that make up the FFF system. Firstly, the laminar flow that carries the sample through the separation chamber and secondly the separation field applied perpendicular to the channel, against the sample flow.

As particles flow along the channel the cross flow separation field pushes the molecules towards the bottom of the channel. As they pass by the bottom they undergo a counter acting diffusion back into the channel against the carrier flow. The extent to which the molecules can diffuse back into the channel is dictated by their natural Brownian motion, a characteristic based on size that is unique to each individual species. Smaller particles have a higher Brownian motion than larger ones and are able to diffuse higher into the channel against the carrier flow.

The rate of laminar flow within the channel is not uniform. It travels in a parabolic pattern with the speed of the flow increasing towards the center of the channel and decreasing towards the sides. Therefore, the rate at which particles will be carried through will depend on their position within the channel. Those with a greater diffusion, located in the center of the channel, will be transported with a greater velocity. The larger particles in the shallow, slower moving stream are transported with lower flow velocity and elute later than smaller particles. This results in a gentle separation of particles based on mass with the elution order of smallest to largest.
