= Evaporative light scattering detector =

Type of destructive chromatography detector

An evaporative light scattering detector (ELSD) is a destructive chromatography detector, used in conjunction with high-performance liquid chromatography (HPLC), ultra high-performance liquid chromatography (UHPLC), purification liquid chromatography such as flash or preparative chromatography (using a splitter), countercurrent or centrifugal partition chromatography and supercritical fluid chromatography (SFC). It is commonly used for analysis of compounds that do not absorb UV-VIS radiation significantly, such as sugars, antiviral drugs, antibiotics, fatty acids, lipids, oils, phospholipids, polymers, surfactants, terpenoids and triglycerides.

ELSDs works by nebulizing the column's effluents into a fine aerosol mist, which then passes through a heated drift tube, where the solvent evaporates. Thus, it can be easily used in gradient method of LC and SFC. The remaining non-volatile analyte particles are carried further by a carrier gas to a light scattering cell, where a beam of light illuminates them and they scatter it. The scattered light proceeds to a photodiode which converts it to a signal, which is proportional to the mass of the analyte particles. This is why it is considered as a sort of "universal detector" as it is able to detect all compound which are less volatile than the mobile phase, i.e. non volatile and semi-volatile compounds.

ELSD is related to the charged aerosol detector (CAD), in which the aerosol is charged. Like the CAD, it falls under the category of destructive detectors.

== Principles of operation ==
ELSDs analyze solutes eluting out of the chromatographic column, both in LC and SFC. As the eluent exits the column's outlet into the detector inlet, it is mixed with an inert carrier gas (usually nitrogen) and forced through a nebulizer, which separates the liquid into fine aerosolized droplets. These droplets then pass into a heated drift tube, where the mobile phase solvent is evaporated off. As the mobile phase evaporates, the droplets become smaller and smaller until all that is left is minute particles of dried analyte. These particles are pushed through the drift tube by the carrier gas to the detection region. In this region, a beam of light crosses the column of analyte and the scattering of light is measured by a photodiode or photomultiplier tube. The detector's output is non-linear across more than one order of magnitude and proper calibration is required for quantitative analysis.
