= UV detector =

Non-destructive chromatography detector measuring UV or visible light absorption

An ultraviolet detector (also known as UV detector or UV-Vis detector) is a type of non-destructive chromatography detector which measures the amount of ultraviolet or visible light absorbed by components of the mixture being eluted off the chromatography column. They are often used as detectors for high-performance liquid chromatography.

The vast majority of liquid chromatographic systems are equipped with ultraviolet (UV) absorption detectors. The most common UV-Vis detectors used are variable wavelength detectors (VWD), photo diode array detectors (PDA), and diode array detectors (DAD). Variable wavelength detectors decide in advance which wavelength is needed for the detection. Its absorbance as function of time is collected in a graphic format called a chromatogram.

As can be seen in Figure 1, these detectors have a light source, a dispersion element that is a diffraction grating or prism, a flow cell, to where the sample arrives directly from the chromatographic column, an optical bench of lenses and mirrors, and a diode that receives the light coming from the optical system and translates it into a signal proportional to light intensity. When the user selects a wavelength for the detector, the optical system rotates the grating or prism in the space, so that the desired wavelength passes through optical system, then the flow cell and reaches the diode. The UV/Vis detector then produces a chromatogram as a two-dimensional (2D) output. This output plots time on the x-axis and response in absorbance units (AU) on the y-axis. The chromatogram is then analyzed by integrating the peaks curves to get their area, then getting their retention time (RT) from the peak maximum to identify them, and then perform quantitative analysis, by comparing their area to those of samples whose concentrations are known, i.e., standards.

== Diode Array UV-VIS Detectors ==
In recent years, diode array UV-Vis detectors have been increasingly used to collect entire spectra at any given moment of data collection. Diode array detectors (DADs) collect entire UV spectra at every point of the eluting peaks while operating as a multi-wavelength UV-Vis detector. This way they give additional information, which help understand more about the nature of the substances appearing in the chromatogram and allow their identification. DADs are the preferred detectors for HPLC method development because they facilitate better peak identification.

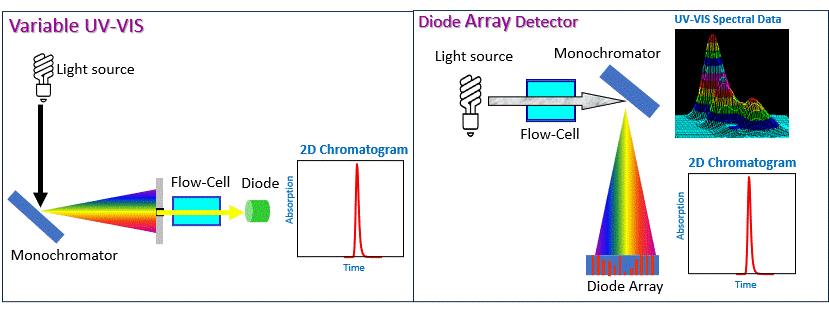
Figure 1: Simplified schemes of the Variable UV-Vis detector compared to PhotoDiode Array detector. In the Variable UV-Vis the entire optical bench is located before the flow cell whereas in the diode array the flow rate is positioned before the main optical bench.

A schematic of the optical systems is shown in Figure 1. The variable UV-Vis absorbance detector's optical bench is showing how the flow cell is positioned after the optical system, including the monochromator, which typically has a physical slit and a moving grating, so it is illuminated by a selected wavelength, reaching a photo-diode. The bench of the diode array detector, however, is configured so that the flow cell is positioned before the optical parts, so that the beam containing the entire spectrum is passing through it. The optical parts consist also with a monochromator and a slit, but with a fixed grating, which disperses the light onto a diode array imaging element.
