= Charged aerosol detector =

Device for measuring chemicals

The charged aerosol detector (CAD) is a detector used in conjunction with high-performance liquid chromatography (HPLC) and ultra high-performance liquid chromatography (UHPLC) to measure the amount of chemicals in a sample by creating charged aerosol particles which are detected using an electrometer. It is commonly used for the analysis of compounds that cannot be detected using traditional UV/Vis approaches due to their lack of a chromophore. The CAD can measure all non-volatile and many semi-volatile analytes including, but not limited to, antibiotics, excipients, ions, lipids, natural products, biofuels, sugars and surfactants. The CAD, like other aerosol detectors (e.g., evaporative light scattering detectors (ELSD) and condensation nucleation light scattering detectors (CNLSD)), falls under the category of destructive general-purpose detectors (see Chromatography detectors).

== History ==
The predecessor to the CAD, termed an evaporative electrical detector, was first described by Kaufman in 2002 at TSI Inc in US patent 6,568,245 and was based on the coupling of liquid chromatographic approaches to TSI's electrical aerosol measurement (EAM) technology. At around the same time Dixon and Peterson at California State University were investigating the coupling of liquid chromatography to an earlier version of TSI's EAM technology, which they called an aerosol charge detector. Subsequent collaboration between TSI and ESA Biosciences Inc. (now part of Thermo Fisher Scientific), led to the first commercial instrument, the Corona CAD, which received both the Pittsburgh Conference Silver Pittcon Editor's Award (2005) and R&D 100 award (2005). Continued research and engineering improvements in product design resulted in CADs with ever increasing capabilities. The newest iterations of the CAD are the Thermo Scientific Corona Veo Charged Aerosol Detector, Corona Veo RS Charged Aerosol Detector and Thermo Scientific Vanquish Charged Aerosol Detectors.

2005	2006	2009	2011	2013	2015
ESA Biosciences, Inc. Corona CAD	ESA Biosciences, Inc. Corona PLUS	ESA Biosciences, Inc. Corona ultra	Dionex Corona ultra RS	Thermo Scientific Dionex Corona Veo	Thermo Scientific Vanquish Charged Aerosol Detector
•First commercial CAD •Designed for near-universal detection on any HPLC •Isocratic or gradient separations	•Expanded solvent compatibility •Heated nebulization •External gas conditioning module for improved precision	•UHPLC compatible •Stackable design •Enhanced sensitivity •Incorporated precision internal gas regulation system	•Unified with Dionex UltiMate 3000 UHPLC+ system •Added on-board diagnostics/monitoring •Automated flow diversion capability •Selection of linearization parameters	•Extended micro flow rate range •Total redesign with concentric nebulization and optimized spray chamber •Heated evaporation and electronic gas regulation	•Full integration with Thermo Scientific Vanquish UHPLC platform •Slide-in module design •Reduced flow path for optimum operation

== Principles of operation ==
The general detection scheme involves:

- Pneumatic nebulization of mobile phase from the analytical column forming an aerosol.
- Aerosol conditioning to remove large droplets.
- Evaporation of solvent from the droplets to form dried particles.
- Particle charging using an ion jet formed via corona discharge.
- Particle selection – an ion trap is used to excess ions and high mobility charged particles.
- Measurement of the aggregate charge of aerosol particles using a filter/electrometer.

The CAD like other aerosol detectors, can only be used with volatile mobile phases. For an analyte to be detected it must be less volatile than the mobile phase.

More detailed information on how CAD works can be found on the Charged Aerosol Detection for Liquid Chromatography Resource Center.

== Performance and comparison to other aerosol detectors ==
- The CAD and evaporative light scattering detector (ELSD) are mass-flow sensitive detectors (response is proportional to mass of analyte reaching the detector per unit time) as opposed to concentration sensitive (response is proportional to analyte concentration within the eluent at a particular time) detectors such as UV detectors.
- Both the CAD and ELSD exhibit non-linear responses for most sample types; however, over small ranges (e.g. 1–100 ng) CAD response is reasonably linear. The shape of the response curves are different between the two detectors.
- Both detectors require the use of fully volatile mobile phases and non-volatile samples. CAD response is dependent on organic content of the mobile phase, response is higher with organic-rich mobile phases than aqueous ones.
- CAD response is quite uniform for non-volatile analytes with detection limit 1–3 ng; however, the response for ionised basic analytes can be larger than for neutral analytes.
- When properly individually optimized, both the CAD and ELSD show similar responses.
- Failure to regularly clean and optimize the mobile phase and gas flow properties of the detector leads to intra- and inter-day precision/ reproducibility errors.
