= Reversed-phase chromatography =

Chromatographic method that uses a non-polar stationary phase

Reversed-phase liquid chromatography (RP-LC) is a mode of liquid chromatography in which non-polar stationary phase and polar mobile phases are used for the separation of organic compounds. In the reversed phase mode, the more hydrophobic sample components are retained in the system for longer. The vast majority of separations and analyses using high-performance liquid chromatography (HPLC) in recent years are done using the reversed phase mode. First developed for separating biomolecules, it is now a general technique with many stationary phases available for use in RP-LC, allowing great flexibility in the development of the separation methods.

Some factors affect how the components are retained and separated in RP-LC:

- The chemical nature of the stationary phase. The stationary phase can be coated with some ligands at different bonding densities (how many ligands are bonded per surface area).
- The composition of the mobile phase. The mobile phase may be made of one solvent, or a mixture of several solvents. The solvents can be mixed at different ratios. Different mobile phases have different properties, such as polarity. When a mobile phase consists of mostly one solvent, with some other solvents added in small amounts, those other solvents are called "mobile phase modifiers".
- The pH of the mobile phase, which affect the ionization state of the solutes and their polarity. This can be changed with additives such as buffers.

Usually, the stationary phase is made of a layer of hydrophobic substrate bonded to the surface of porous silica gel particles. The particles come in various shapes (spheric, irregular), at different diameters (sub-2, 3, 5, 7, 10 μm), with varying pore diameters (60, 100, 150, 300 Å). The particle diameters are often given as mesh numbers. For example, 2500-mesh corresponds to a particle diameter of 5 μm. The hydrophobic substrates are generally alkyl chains, such as C3, C4, C8, C18, or more. The longer the chain, the longer the sample components will be retained. It would make the resolution power higher, but also make the chromatography take longer to run. Most current methods of separation of biomedical materials use C18 columns, sometimes called by trade names, such as ODS (octadecylsilane) or RP-18 (reverse phase 18).

Ordinary silica-based reversed-phase columns work best in a moderate pH range. At very low pH or very high pH, the silica surface and the bonded hydrophobic layer can degrade. For RP-LC at very acidic or alkaline conditions, one can use hydrophobic polymeric particles, or hybridized silica-organic groups particles.

Hydrophobic polymeric particles are made from an organic polymer instead of silica. A common example is polystyrene-divinylbenzene (PS-DVB). The particle itself is hydrophobic, so organic compounds can adsorb to it directly.

Pure silica dissolves in alkaline conditions. Hybrid silica-organic particles are particles whose framework contains both silica units and organic groups. A typical structure is something like: Si–O–Si mixed with Si–R–Si, where R is an organic linker, such as an ethylene group. This makes the particle more resistant to alkaline conditions.

The mobile phases are mixtures of water and polar organic solvents, usually methanol and acetonitrile. These mixtures usually contain various additives such as buffers (acetate, phosphate, citrate), surfactants (alkyl amines or alkyl sulfonates) and special additives (EDTA). The goal of using supplements of one kind or another is to increase efficiency, selectivity, and control solute retention.

== Stationary phases ==
The history and evolution of reversed phase stationary phases is described in detail in an article by Majors, Dolan, Carr and Snyder.

In the 1970s, most liquid chromatography runs were performed using solid particles as the stationary phases, made of unmodified silica gel or alumina. This type of technique is now referred to as normal-phase chromatography. In normal-phase chromatography, the stationary phase is hydrophilic, and the mobile phase is non-polar/hydrophobic, consisting of organic solvents such as hexane and heptane.

However, normal-phase chromatography is poorly suited for many biomolecules, so reversed-phase chromatography was developed. Specifically, many biomolecules are polar, so they do not dissolve well in a nonpolar mobile phase.

With reversed phase, the mobile phase is polar, which well-dissolves hydrophilic molecules. The use of a nonpolar stationary phase and polar mobile phases is essentially the reverse of normal phase chromatography, since the polarity of the mobile and stationary phases have been inverted – hence the term reversed-phase chromatography. As a result, hydrophobic molecules in the polar mobile phase tend to adsorb to the hydrophobic stationary phase, and hydrophilic molecules in the sample pass through the column and are eluted first. Hydrophobic molecules can be eluted from the column by decreasing the polarity of the mobile phase using an organic (non-polar) solvent, which reduces hydrophobic interactions. The more hydrophobic the molecule, the more strongly it will bind to the stationary phase, and the higher the concentration of organic solvent that will be required to elute the molecule.

The pore size has an effect as well. A particle with small pores would exclude large molecules from accessing most of the surface area on that particle. This means larger molecules would have lower retention time than smaller molecules, even if they are chemically similar otherwise.

Many of the mathematical parameters of the theory of chromatography and experimental considerations used in other chromatographic methods apply to RP-LC as well (for example, the selectivity factor, chromatographic resolution, plate count, etc.).

=== Silica-based stationary phases ===
Idealized cartoon of silica gel before and after treatment with octadecyltrichlorosilane (C_{18}H_{37}SiCl_{3}. Most silanol groups (red) are converted to hydrophobic alkylsiloxy groups.

Silica gel particles are commonly used as a stationary phase in high-performance liquid chromatography (HPLC) for several reasons:

1. Silica gel particles have a high surface area for interactions to take place, either with solutes or bonding with ligands.
2. Silica gel does not react with many types of solvents and analytes.
3. Silica gel can be modified with various functional groups.
4. Silica gel is cheap.
5. Silica gel particles are easy to engineer into specific diameters, shapes, pore sizes, etc.

The silica particle can have different shapes. The particle can be fully solid ("monolithic" or "fused"), full of holes ("porous"), or have a solid core and a porous shell ("superficially porous"). The particle can have different diameters. The pores can have different diameters.

The United States Pharmacopoeia (USP) has classified HPLC columns by L# types. The most popular column in this classification is an octadecyl carbon chain (C18)-bonded silica (USP classification L1). This is followed by C8-bonded silica (L7), pure silica (L3), cyano-bonded silica (CN) (L10) and phenyl-bonded silica (L11). Note that C18, C8 and phenyl are dedicated reversed-phase stationary phases, while CN columns can be used in a reversed-phase mode depending on analyte and mobile phase conditions. Not all C18 columns have identical retention properties. Surface functionalization of silica can be performed in a monomeric or a polymeric reaction with different short-chain organosilanes used in a second step to cover remaining silanol groups (end-capping). While the overall retention mechanism remains the same, subtle differences in the surface chemistries of different stationary phases will lead to changes in selectivity.

Modern columns have different polarity depending on the ligand bonded to the stationary phase. PFP is pentafluorophenyl. CN is cyano. NH2 is amino. ODS is octadecyl or C18. ODCN is a mixed mode column consisting of C18 and nitrile.

== Mobile phases ==
A mobile phase in RP-LC consists of mixtures of water or aqueous buffers, to which further solvents are added, to elute analytes from a reversed-phase column in a selective manner. The added solvents must be miscible with water. These are also called "modifiers", since they modify the polarity of the mobile phase. Water is the most polar solvent in the reversed phase mobile phase. To increase the elution strength of the mobile phase, one usually add modifiers to lower its polarity. Common modifiers include acetonitrile (ACN), methanol (MeOH), 2-propanol (isopropanol, IPA), ethanol (EtOH) and tetrahydrofuran (THF).

=== Viscosity ===
If the evolent has high viscosity, it would produce a high backpressure. Consequently, low-viscosity evolents are preferred.

IPA is strongly eluting, but also very viscuous, which results in high backpressures. ACN and MeOH are less viscous than IPA, although a mixture of 50:50 percent of MeOH:water is also very viscous. In general, as the ratio of organic solvent:water increases from 0:1 to 1:0, the viscosity increases, then decreases again.

In general, backpressure increased when the flow rate is increased, the mobile phase temperature is lowered, or the stationary phase particle size is increased.

=== Absorbance ===
When components are detected optically, the mobile phase should have high transmittance at the wavelength the detector uses. Most solvents are more transparent at longer wavelengths. Consequently, researchers usually speak of "cutoff wavelengths" of solvents. A solvent's cutoff wavelength is the wavelength at which the absorbance of the solvent equals 1 AU. A modifier should only be used with light above the cutoff wavelength.

Commonly used values: ACN 190 nm, acetone 330 nm, diethylamine 275 nm, EtOH 210 nm, IPA 205 nm, isopropyl ether 220 nm, MeOH 205 nm, 1-propanol 210 nm, THF 230 nm. Most peptides only absorb at low wavelengths in the ultra-violet spectrum (typically less than 225 nm), and consequently for RP-LC with peptides, the most commonly used modifier is ACN.

=== pH buffering ===
The pH of the mobile phase can change the retention and selectivity of analytes. For samples containing solutes with ionized functional groups, such as amines, carboxyls, phosphates, phosphonates, sulfates, and sulfonates, the ionization of these groups can be controlled by controlling the pH of the mobile phase. The pH of the mobile phase can be controlled by mobile phase buffers.

In general, molecules with acidic function groups are increasingly ionized under more alkaline environments, and thus its retention time would decrease. Conversely, under more acidic environments, its retention time would increase. Conversely for molecules with alkaline function groups.

For example, carboxylic groups in solutes become increasingly negatively charged as the pH of the mobile phase rises above their pKa, hence the whole molecule becomes more polar and less retained on the a-polar stationary phase. In this case, raising the pH of the phase mobile above 4–5 = pH (which is the typical pKa range for carboxylic groups) increases their ionization, hence decreases their retention. Similarly, molecules with amine groups usually have pKa around 8. However, since silica gel is not stable in alkaline environments, the mobile phase typically does not have pH above 8. Therefore, control over the retention of amines is limited when the stationary phase is based on silica gel.

The choice of buffer type is an important factor in RP-LC method development, as it can affect the retention, selectivity, and resolution of the analytes of interest. There are many buffers used in RP-HPLC, including phosphate, aetate, formate, and ammonium.

- A buffer buffers most effectively around its pKa value, so the pKa of the buffer should be close to the desired mobile phase pH.
- The buffer must be compatible with the solvent that is being used in the mobile phase, mostly with the common organic solvents mentioned above, acetonitrile, methanol, and isopropanol.
- If UV absorption spectroscopy is used for detection, the buffer should have low absorption at the chosen wavelength.
- If mass spectrometry (MS) is used for detection, the buffer must be compatible with the MS instrument. Some buffers, such as those containing phosphate salts, cannot be used with the MS detectors, as they are not volatile, and they suppress the analytes ionization, making them undetected by MS.

Charged analytes can also be separated by ion interaction reverse-phase chromatography.

== See also ==
- Aqueous normal-phase chromatography
