= Nitrogen–phosphorus detector =

Detector used in chromatography

The nitrogen–phosphorus detector (NPD) is also known as thermionic specific detector (TSD) is a detector commonly used with gas chromatography, in which thermal energy is used to ionize an analyte. It is a type of flame thermionic detector (FTD), the other being the alkali flame-ionization detector (AFID also known as AFD).

With this method, nitrogen and phosphorus can be selectively detected with a sensitivity that is 10^{4} times greater than that for carbon.

== NP-Mode ==
A concentration of hydrogen gas is used such that it is just below the minimum required for ignition. A rubidium or cesium bead, which is mounted over the nozzle, ignites the hydrogen (by acting catalytically), and forms a cold plasma. Excitation of the alkali metal results in ejection of electrons, which in turn are detected as a current flow between an anode and cathode in the chamber. As nitrogen or phosphorus analytes exit the column, they cause a reduction in the work function of the metal bead, resulting in an increase in current. Since the alkali metal bead is consumed over time, it must be replaced regularly .

== See also ==
- Gas chromatography
