= Supercritical fluid chromatography =

Normal phase chromatography that uses a supercritical fluid as the mobile phase

Supercritical fluid chromatography (SFC) is a form of normal phase chromatography that uses a supercritical fluid such as carbon dioxide as the mobile phase. It is used for the analysis and purification of low to moderate molecular weight, thermally labile molecules and can also be used for the separation of chiral compounds. Principles are similar to those of high performance liquid chromatography (HPLC); however, SFC typically utilizes carbon dioxide as the mobile phase. Therefore, the entire chromatographic flow path must be pressurized. Because the supercritical phase represents a state whereby bulk liquid and gas properties converge, supercritical fluid chromatography is sometimes called convergence chromatography. The idea of liquid and gas properties convergence was first envisioned by Giddings.

== Applications ==
SFC has been used primarily for separation of chiral molecules, mainly those which required normal phase conditions. While the mobile phase is a fluid in the supercritical state, the stationary phase is packed inside columns similar to those used in liquid chromatography. Since the use of normal phase mode of chromatography remained less common, so did SFC; therefore it is now commonly used for selected chiral and achiral separations and purification in the pharmaceutical industry.

== Apparatus ==
Instrumentation of supercritical fluid chromatography SFC has a similar setup to an HPLC instrument. The stationary phases are similar, and are packed inside similar column types. However, there are special features in these systems, because of the need to keep the mobile phase at supercritical fluidic state over the entire system. Temperature is critical to keep the fluids in a supercritical state, so there should be a heat control tool in the system, similar to that of GC. Also, there should be a precise pressure control mechanism, a restrictor to keep the pressure above a certain point, because pressure is another essential parameter to keep the mobile phase in a supercritical fluid state, so it is kept at the required minimal level. A microprocessor mechanism is placed in the instrument for SFC. This unit collects data for pressure, oven temperature, and detector performance to control the related pieces of the instrument.

CO_{2} utilized in carbon dioxide dedicated pumps, which require that the incoming CO_{2} and pump heads be kept cold, in order to maintain the carbon dioxide at a temperature and pressure fit for supercritical fluidic state, where it can be effectively metered at a specified flow rate range. The CO_{2} subsequently becomes supercritical fluid throughout the injector and the column oven, when the temperature and pressure it is subjected to, are raised above the critical point of the liquid, thus the supercritical state is achieved.

Supercritical fluids combine useful properties of gas and liquid phases, as it can behave like both a gas and a liquid in various aspects. A supercritical fluid provides a gas-like characteristic when it fills a container and it takes the shape of the container. The motion and kinetics of the molecules are quite similar to gas molecules. On the other hand, a supercritical fluid behaves like a liquid because its density property is near liquid; thus, a supercritical fluid shows a similarity to the dissolving effect of a liquid. The result is that one can load masses, similar to those used in HPLC, on column per injection, and still maintain a high chromatographic efficiency similar to those attained in GC. Typically, gradient elution is employed in analytical SFC using a polar co-solvent such as methanol, possibly with a weak acid or base at low concentrations ~1%. The apparent plate count per analysis can be observed to exceed 500K plates per meter routinely with 5 um stationary phases. The operator uses software to set mobile phase flow rate, co-solvent composition, system back pressure and column oven temperature, which must exceed 40 °C for supercritical conditions needed to be achieved with CO_{2}. In addition, SFC provides an additional control parameter – pressure – by using an automated static and dynamic back pressure regulator. From an operational standpoint, SFC is as simple and robust as HPLC, but fraction collection is more convenient because the primary mobile phase evaporates leaving only the analyte and a small volume of polar co-solvent. If the outlet CO_{2} is captured, it can be re-compressed and recycled, allowing for >90% reuse of CO_{2}.

Similar to HPLC, SFC uses a variety of detection methods including UV/VIS, mass spectrometry, FID (unlike HPLC) and evaporative light scattering.

== Sample preparation ==
A rule-of-thumb is that any molecule that will dissolve in methanol or a less polar solvent is compatible with SFC, including non-volatile polar solutes. CO_{2} has polarity similar to n-heptane at its critical point. The solvent's elution strength can be increased just by increasing density or alternatively, using a polar co-solvent. In practice, when the fraction of the co-solvent is high, the mobile phase might not be truly at supercritical fluid state, but this terminology is used regardless, and the chromatograms show better elution and higher efficiency nevertheless.

== Mobile phase ==
The mobile phase is composed primarily of supercritical carbon dioxide, but since CO_{2} on its own is too non-polar to effectively elute many analytes, cosolvents are added to modify the mobile phase polarity. Cosolvents are typically simple alcohols like methanol, ethanol, or isopropyl alcohol. Other solvents such as acetonitrile, chloroform, or ethyl acetate can be used as modifiers. For food-grade materials, the selected cosolvent is often ethanol or ethyl acetate, both of which are generally recognized as safe (GRAS). The solvent limitations are system and column based.

== Drawbacks ==
There have been a few technical issues that have limited adoption of SFC technology in the past. First of all, is the need to keep a high gas pressure in the operating conditions. High-pressure vessels are expensive and bulky, and special materials are often needed to avoid dissolving gaskets and O-rings in the supercritical fluid. A second drawback is difficulty in maintaining pressure constant (by back-pressure regulation). Whereas liquids are nearly incompressible, so their densities are constant regardless of pressure, supercritical fluids are highly compressible and their physical properties change with pressure – such as the pressure drop across a packed-bed column. Currently, automated backpressure regulators can maintain a constant pressure in the column even if flow rate varies, mitigating this problem. A third drawback is difficulty in gas/liquid separation during collection of product. Upon depressurization, the CO_{2} rapidly turns into gas and aerosolizes any dissolved analyte in the process. Cyclone separators have lessened difficulties in gas/liquid separations.
