= Chromatography column =

Chromatography instrument

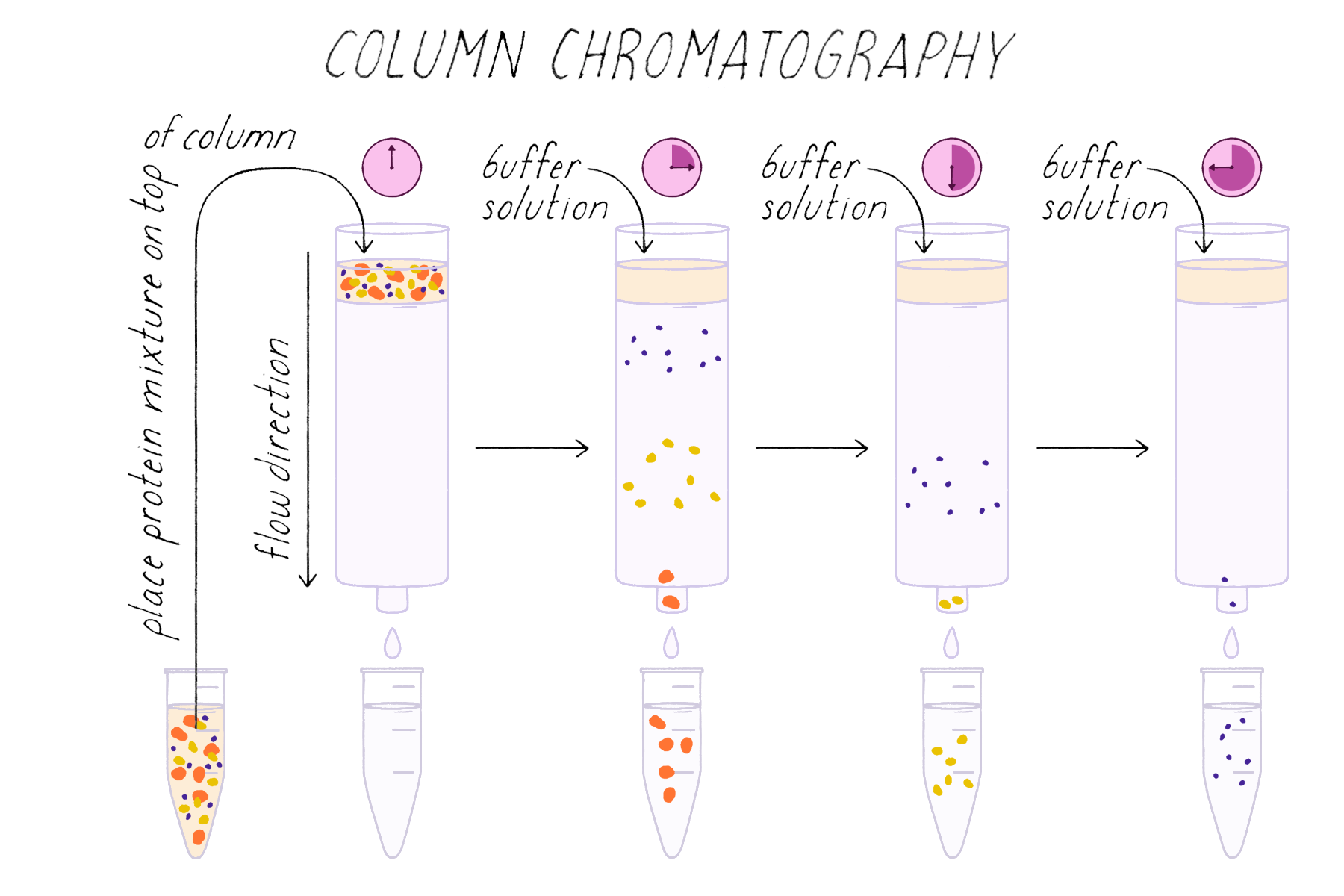
A biochemical method to separate proteins, or other molecules, based upon properties such as size, charge, or affinity for specific molecules.

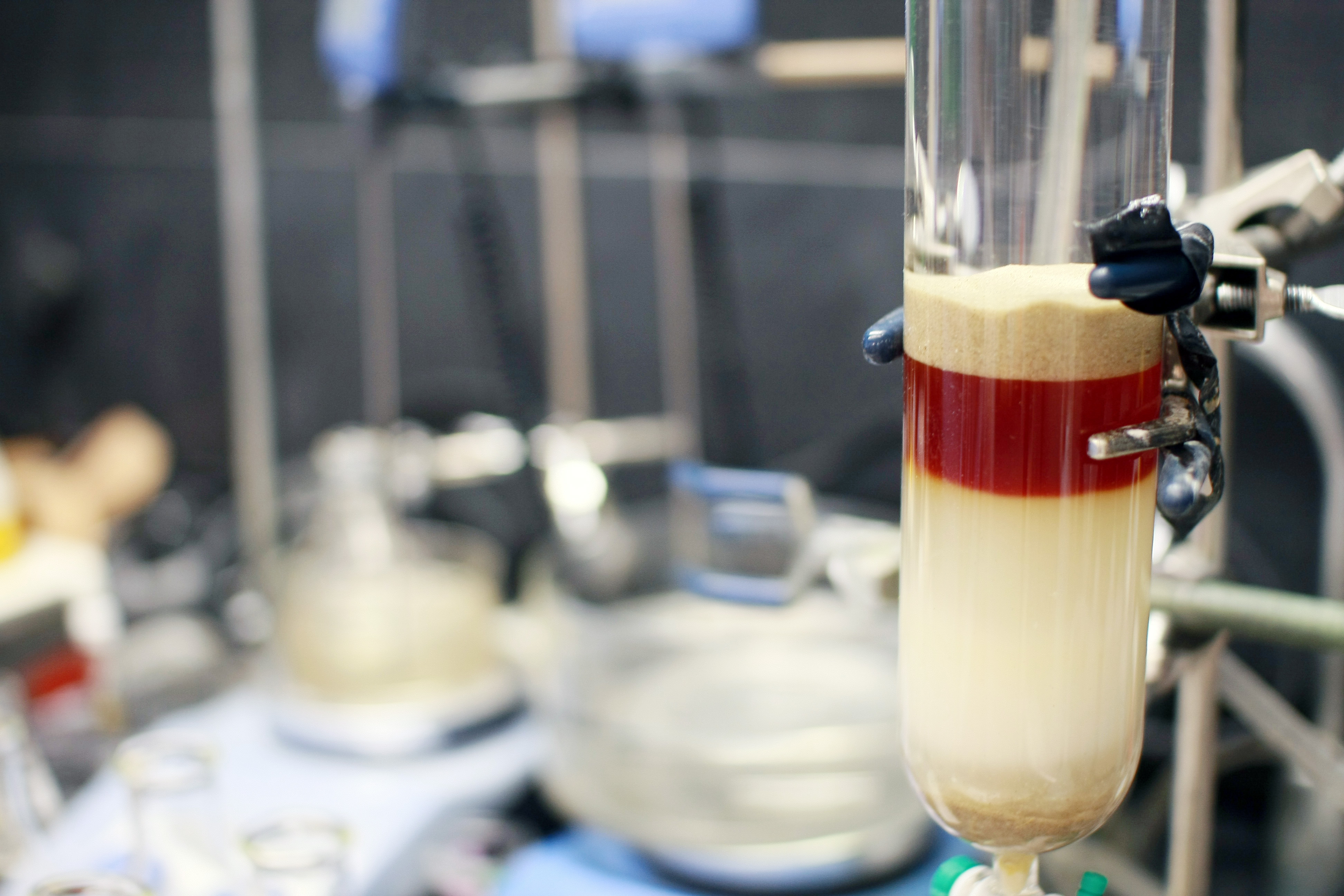
Chromatography column

A chromatography column is a device used in chromatography for the separation of chemical compounds. A chromatography column contains the stationary phase, allowing the mobile phase to pass through it.

== Materials ==
Chromatography columns of different types are used in both gas and liquid chromatography:

- Liquid chromatography: Traditional chromatography columns were made of glass. Modern columns are mostly made of borosilicate glass, acrylic glass or stainless steel. To prevent the stationary phase from leaking out of the column interior a polymer, stainless steel or ceramic net is usually applied. Depending on the application material- and size-requirements may change.
- Gas chromatography (GC): Older columns were made of glass or metal packed with particles of a solid stationary phase. More recently, narrower diameter (capillary) columns have been made using fused silica coated on the inside with a film of the stationary phase material. GC columns are typically very long to take advantage of their low resistance to the flow of carrier gas. The materials of the column and the stationary phase must be suitable for GC operating temperatures, which may range as high as 300°C or more.

== Sizes ==
While small-scale columns range from inner diameters of 0.5 cm and withstand pressures of up to 130 MPa, industrial large scale columns reach diameters of up to 2 m and operate at considerable lower pressures (below 1 MPa). While it is favorable to view the packed bed of a column large scale columns are manufactured from steel due to its superior resilience.

Chromatography columns can be used as stand-alone devices or in combination with manual or automated chromatography systems. Medium to large columns are almost exclusively operated together with automated systems to decrease the risk of process failure and loss of product.

== Different columns for different scales ==
=== Small scale ===
Transitions between scales are always fluent. There is no sharp cut that defines the end of small- and the beginning of medium/pilot scale. However, chromatography columns with an inner diameter (ID) of up to 5 cm are generally considered small scale or laboratory scale columns.

Small scale chromatography columns are mostly intended for design of experiments (DoE); proof of concept; validation (drug manufacture) or research and development experiments. Columns of this scale category are distinguished by their small dimensions in comparison to chromatography columns intended for larger scales as well as relatively high pressure tolerance and selection of materials in contact with the liquid phase. This is especially important for applications in the biopharmaceutical industry which underlie close scrutiny by regulatory agencies (U.S. Food and Drug Administration; European Medicines Agency).

== See also ==
- Separation process
