= High-performance liquid chromatography =

Technique in analytical chemistry

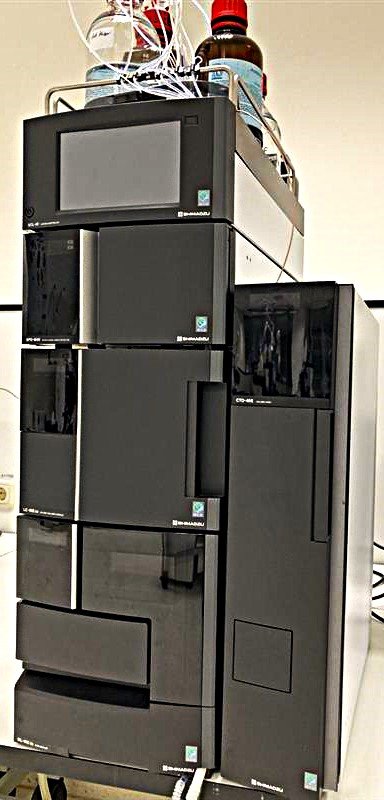
A modern self-contained HPLC

Schematic representation of an HPLC unit (1) solvent reservoirs, (2) solvent degasser, (3) gradient valve, (4) mixing vessel for delivery of the mobile phase, (5) high-pressure pump, (6) switching valve in "inject position", (6') switching valve in "load position", (7) sample injection loop, (8) pre-column (guard column), (9) analytical column, (10) detector (i.e., IR, UV), (11) data acquisition, (12) waste or fraction collector

High-performance liquid chromatography (HPLC), formerly referred to as high-pressure liquid chromatography, is a chromatography technique in analytical chemistry used to separate, identify, and quantify specific components (analytes) in mixtures. The mixtures can originate from food, chemicals, pharmaceuticals, biological, environmental and agriculture, etc., in which the sample analyzed is either a liquid or has been dissolved into a liquid.

HPLC is essentially a pressurized form of column chromatography, which uses pressurized pumps instead of the force of gravity, and thinner and longer columns with smaller adsorbent particles. These increase its analytic resolution.

HPLC is widely used for manufacturing (e.g., during the production process of pharmaceutical and biological products), legal (e.g., detecting performance enhancement drugs in urine), research (e.g., separating the components of a complex biological sample, or of similar synthetic chemicals from each other), and medical (e.g., detecting vitamin D levels in blood serum) purposes.

High pressure pumps force mixtures of various solvents (the mobile phase, e.g., water, buffers, acetonitrile and/or methanol) to flow through a sample mixture and pick up analytes, delivering it into a cylinder (the chromatography column). The column is filled with solid particles made of adsorbent material (the stationary phase). The particles are usually made of silica, polymers, and 1.5–50 μm in diameter. Elution occurs as the mobile phase passes through the stationary phase. Each component in the sample interacts differently with the adsorbent material and the solvents, so their rates of elution are different. These different rates lead to analytical separation of the species in the fluid that flows out of the column (the eluate). The eluate enters a specific chromatography detector such as UV detectors, which produces a graph (the chromatogram). A chromatogram is a graph of detector signal intensity versus time or the volume of the mobile phase. If the analytes are well-separated, then the chromatogram would show well-separated peaks, one per analyte. Each analyte appears in its respective time (retention time) having area proportional to its amount.

Chromatography can be described as a mass transfer process involving adsorption and/or partition. As mentioned, HPLC relies on pumps to pass a pressurized liquid and a sample mixture through a column filled with the adsorbent (the active component of the column). Some analytes may strongly attach to the adsorbent rather than the eluent, while other analytes may do the opposite. That is, the analytes may have different partition coefficients, leading to the separation of the analytes. The interaction between the analyte, the solid phase, and the liquid phase, are physical or chemically reversible, usually a combination of non-covalent interactions.

== Operation ==
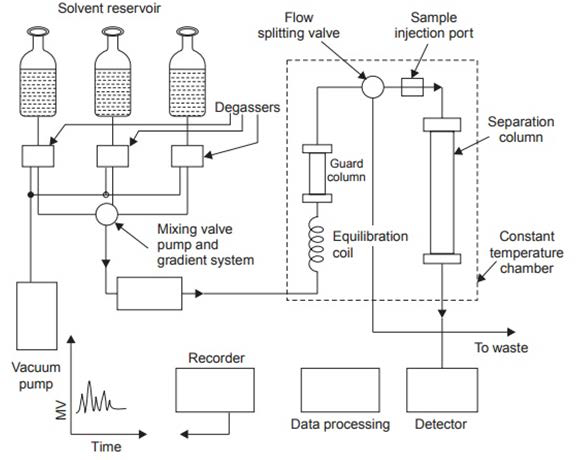
Simplified flow diagram of a high-performance liquid chromatography (HPLC) system

HPLC is distinguished from traditional ("low pressure") liquid chromatography because operational pressures are significantly higher (around 50–1400 bar), while ordinary liquid chromatography typically relies on the force of gravity to pass the mobile phase through the packed column. Due to the small sample amount separated in analytical HPLC, typical column dimensions are 2.1–4.6 mm diameter, and 30–250 mm length. Also HPLC columns are made with smaller adsorbent particles (1.5–50 μm in average particle size). This gives HPLC superior resolving power (the ability to distinguish between compounds) when separating mixtures in a shorter period of time, which makes it a popular chromatographic technique.

The schematic of an HPLC instrument typically includes solvents' reservoirs, one or more pumps, a solvent-degasser, a sampler, a column, and a detector. The solvents are prepared in advance according to the needs of the separation, they pass through the degasser to remove dissolved gasses, mixed to become the mobile phase, then flow through the sampler, which brings the sample mixture into the mobile phase stream, which then carries it into the column. The pumps deliver the desired flow and composition of the mobile phase through the stationary phase inside the column, then directly into a flow-cell inside the detector. The detector generates a signal proportional to the amount of sample component emerging from the column, hence allowing for quantitative analysis of the sample components. The detector also marks the time of emergence, the retention time, which serves for initial identification of the component. More advanced detectors, provide also additional information, specific to the analyte's characteristics, such as UV-VIS spectrum or mass spectrum, which can provide insight on its structural features. These detectors are in common use, such as UV/Vis, photodiode array (PDA) / diode array detector and mass spectrometry detector.

A digital microprocessor and user software control the HPLC instrument and provide data analysis. Some models of mechanical pumps in an HPLC instrument can mix multiple solvents together at a ratios changing in time, generating a composition gradient in the mobile phase. Newer HPLC instruments have a column oven that allows for adjusting the temperature at which the separation is performed.

The sample mixture to be separated and analyzed is introduced, in a discrete small volume (typically microliters), into the stream of mobile phase percolating through the column. The components of the sample move through the column, each at a different velocity, which are a function of specific physical interactions with the adsorbent, the stationary phase. The velocity of each component depends on its chemical nature, on the nature of the stationary phase (inside the column) and on the composition of the mobile phase. The time at which a specific analyte elutes (emerges from the column) is called its retention time. The retention time, measured under particular conditions, is an identifying characteristic of a given analyte.

Many different types of columns are available, filled with adsorbents varying in particle size, porosity, and surface chemistry. The use of smaller particle size packing materials requires the use of higher operational pressure ("backpressure") and typically improves chromatographic resolution (the degree of peak separation between consecutive analytes emerging from the column). Sorbent particles may be ionic, hydrophobic or polar in nature.

The most common mode of liquid chromatography is reversed phase, whereby the mobile phases used include any miscible combination of water or buffers with various organic solvents (the most common are acetonitrile and methanol). Some HPLC techniques use water-free mobile phases (see normal-phase chromatography below). The aqueous component of the mobile phase may contain acids (such as formic, phosphoric or trifluoroacetic acid) or salts to assist in the separation of the sample components. The composition of the mobile phase may be kept constant ("isocratic elution mode") or varied ("gradient elution mode") during the chromatographic analysis. Isocratic elution is typically effective in the separation of simple mixtures. Gradient elution is required for complex mixtures, with varying interactions with the stationary and mobile phases. This is the reason why in gradient elution the composition of the mobile phase is varied typically from low to high eluting strength. The eluting strength of the mobile phase is reflected by analyte retention times, as the high eluting strength speeds up the elution (resulting in shortening of retention times). For example, a typical gradient profile in reversed phase chromatography might start at 5% acetonitrile (in water or aqueous buffer) and progress linearly to 95% acetonitrile over 5–25 minutes. Periods of constant mobile phase composition (plateau) may be also part of a gradient profile. For example, the mobile phase composition may be kept constant at 5% acetonitrile for 1–3 min, followed by a linear change up to 95% acetonitrile.

The chosen composition of the mobile phase depends on the intensity of interactions between various sample components ("analytes") and stationary phase (e.g., hydrophobic interactions in reversed-phase HPLC). Depending on their affinity for the stationary and mobile phases, analytes partition between the two during the separation process taking place in the column. This partitioning process is similar to that which occurs during a liquid–liquid extraction but is continuous, not step-wise.

In the example using a water/acetonitrile gradient, the more hydrophobic components will elute (come off the column) later, then, once the mobile phase gets richer in acetonitrile (i.e., in a mobile phase becomes higher eluting solution), their elution speeds up.

The choice of mobile phase components, additives (such as salts or acids) and gradient conditions depends on the nature of the column and sample components. Often a series of trial runs is performed with the sample in order to find the HPLC method which gives adequate separation.

== History and development ==
Prior to HPLC, scientists used benchtop column liquid chromatographic techniques. Liquid chromatographic systems were largely inefficient due to the flow rate of solvents being dependent on gravity. Separations took many hours, and sometimes days to complete. Gas chromatography (GC) at the time was more powerful than liquid chromatography (LC), however, it was obvious that gas phase separation and analysis of very polar high molecular weight biopolymers was impossible. GC was ineffective for many life science and health applications for biomolecules, because they are mostly non-volatile and thermally unstable at the high temperatures of GC. As a result, alternative methods were hypothesized which would soon result in the development of HPLC.

Following on the seminal work of Martin and Synge in 1941, it was predicted by Calvin Giddings, Josef Huber, and others in the 1960s that LC could be operated in the high-efficiency mode by reducing the packing-particle diameter substantially below the typical LC (and GC) level of 150 μm and using pressure to increase the mobile phase velocity. These predictions underwent extensive experimentation and refinement throughout the 60s into the 70s until these very days. Early developmental research began to improve LC particles, for example the historic Zipax, a superficially porous particle.

The 1970s brought about many developments in hardware and instrumentation. Researchers began using pumps and injectors to make a rudimentary design of an HPLC system. Gas amplifier pumps were ideal because they operated at constant pressure and did not require leak-free seals or check valves for steady flow and good quantitation. Hardware milestones were made at Dupont IPD (Industrial Polymers Division) such as a low-dwell-volume gradient device being utilized as well as replacing the septum injector with a loop injection valve.

While instrumentation developments were important, the history of HPLC is primarily about the history and evolution of particle technology. After the introduction of porous layer particles, there has been a steady trend to reduced particle size to improve efficiency. However, by decreasing particle size, new problems arose. The practical disadvantages stem from the excessive pressure drop needed to force mobile fluid through the column and the difficulty of preparing a uniform packing of extremely fine materials. Every time particle size is reduced significantly, another round of instrument development usually must occur to handle the pressure.

== Types ==
=== Partition chromatography ===
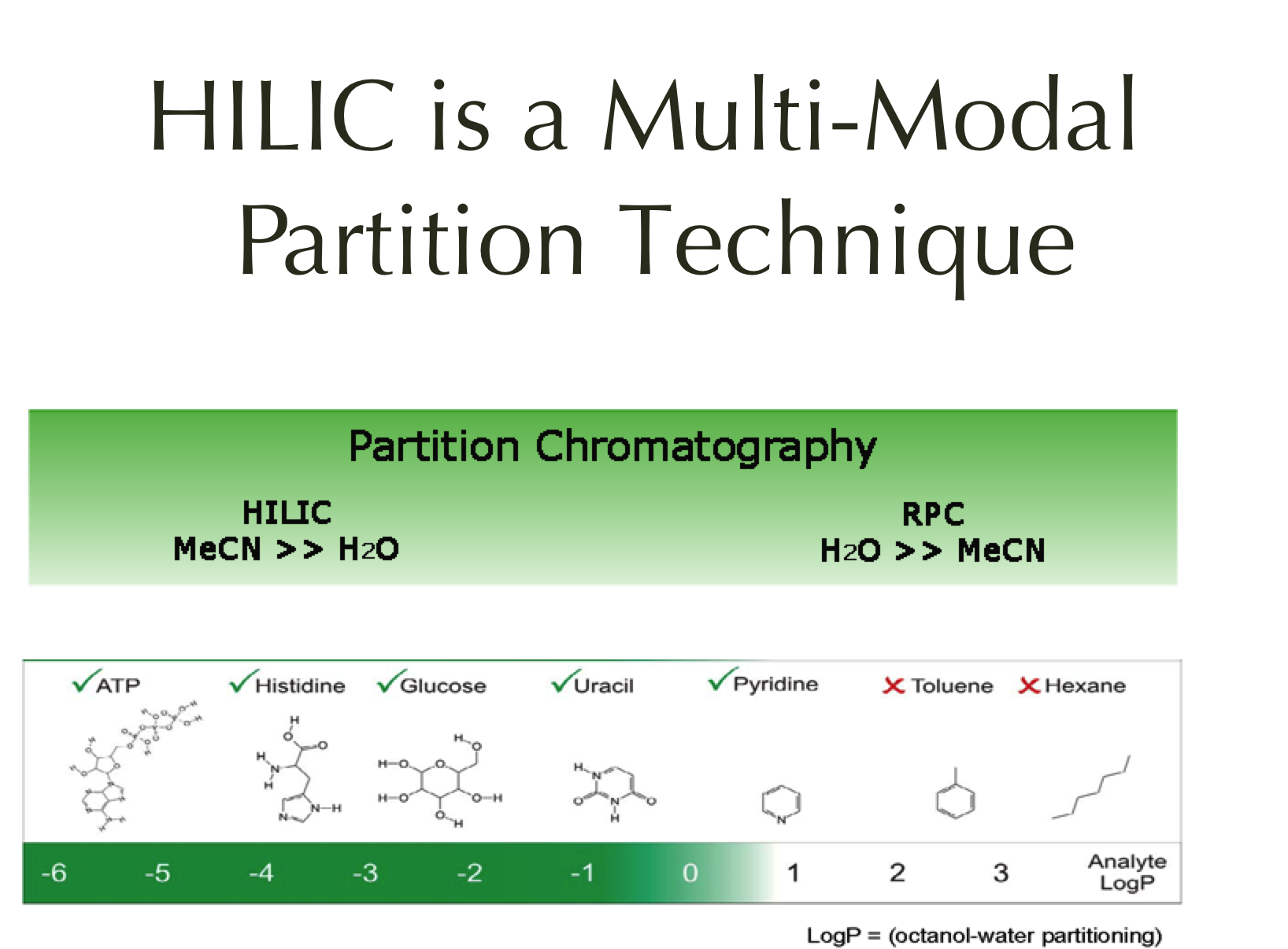
HILIC partition technique useful range

Partition chromatography was one of the first kinds of chromatography that chemists developed, and is barely used these days. The partition coefficient principle has been applied in paper chromatography, thin layer chromatography, gas phase and liquid–liquid separation applications. The 1952 Nobel Prize in chemistry was earned by Archer John Porter Martin and Richard Laurence Millington Synge for their development of the technique, which was used for their separation of amino acids. Partition chromatography uses a retained solvent, on the surface or within the grains or fibers of an "inert" solid supporting matrix as with paper chromatography; or takes advantage of some coulombic and/or hydrogen donor interaction with the stationary phase. Analyte molecules partition between a liquid stationary phase and the eluent. Just as in hydrophilic interaction chromatography (HILIC; a sub-technique within HPLC), this method separates analytes based on differences in their polarity. HILIC most often uses a bonded polar stationary phase and a mobile phase made primarily of acetonitrile with water as the strong component. Partition HPLC has been used historically on unbonded silica or alumina supports. Each works effectively for separating analytes by relative polar differences. HILIC bonded phases have the advantage of separating acidic, basic and neutral solutes in a single chromatographic run.

The polar analytes diffuse into a stationary water layer associated with the polar stationary phase and are thus retained. The stronger the interactions between the polar analyte and the polar stationary phase (relative to the mobile phase) the longer the elution time. The interaction strength depends on the functional groups part of the analyte molecular structure, with more polarized groups (e.g., hydroxyl-) and groups capable of hydrogen bonding inducing more retention. Coulombic (electrostatic) interactions can also increase retention. Use of more polar solvents in the mobile phase will decrease the retention time of the analytes, whereas more hydrophobic solvents tend to increase retention times.

=== Normal–phase chromatography ===
Normal–phase chromatography was one of the first kinds of HPLC that chemists developed, but has decreased in use over the last decades. Also known as normal-phase HPLC (NP-HPLC), this method separates analytes based on their affinity for a polar stationary surface such as silica; hence it is based on analyte ability to engage in polar interactions (such as hydrogen-bonding or dipole-dipole type of interactions) with the sorbent surface. NP-HPLC uses a non-polar, non-aqueous mobile phase (e.g., chloroform), and works effectively for separating analytes readily soluble in non-polar solvents. The analyte associates with and is retained by the polar stationary phase. Adsorption strengths increase with increased analyte polarity. The interaction strength depends not only on the functional groups present in the structure of the analyte molecule, but also on steric factors. The effect of steric hindrance on interaction strength allows this method to resolve (separate) structural isomers.

The use of more polar solvents in the mobile phase will decrease the retention time of analytes, whereas more hydrophobic solvents tend to induce slower elution (increased retention times). Very polar solvents such as traces of water in the mobile phase tend to adsorb to the solid surface of the stationary phase forming a stationary bound (water) layer which is considered to play an active role in retention. This behavior is somewhat peculiar to normal phase chromatography because it is governed almost exclusively by an adsorptive mechanism (i.e., analytes interact with a solid surface rather than with the solvated layer of a ligand attached to the sorbent surface; see also reversed-phase HPLC below). Adsorption chromatography is still somewhat used for structural isomer separations in both column and thin-layer chromatography formats on activated (dried) silica or alumina supports.

Partition- and NP-HPLC fell out of favor in the 1970s with the development of reversed-phase HPLC because of poor reproducibility of retention times due to the presence of a water or protic organic solvent layer on the surface of the silica or alumina chromatographic media. This layer changes with any changes in the composition of the mobile phase (e.g., moisture level) causing drifting retention times.

Recently, partition chromatography has become popular again with the development of Hilic bonded phases which demonstrate improved reproducibility, and due to a better understanding of the range of usefulness of the technique.

=== Displacement chromatography ===
The use of displacement chromatography is rather limited, and is mostly used for preparative chromatography. The basic principle is based on a molecule with a high affinity for the chromatography matrix (the displacer) which is used to compete effectively for binding sites, and thus displace all molecules with lesser affinities. There are distinct differences between displacement and elution chromatography. In elution mode, substances typically emerge from a column in narrow, Gaussian peaks. Wide separation of peaks, preferably to baseline, is desired in order to achieve maximum purification. The speed at which any component of a mixture travels down the column in elution mode depends on many factors. But for two substances to travel at different speeds, and thereby be resolved, there must be substantial differences in some interaction between the biomolecules and the chromatography matrix. Operating parameters are adjusted to maximize the effect of this difference. In many cases, baseline separation of the peaks can be achieved only with gradient elution and low column loadings. Thus, two drawbacks to elution mode chromatography, especially at the preparative scale, are operational complexity, due to gradient solvent pumping, and low throughput, due to low column loadings. Displacement chromatography has advantages over elution chromatography in that components are resolved into consecutive zones of pure substances rather than "peaks". Because the process takes advantage of the nonlinearity of the isotherms, a larger column feed can be separated on a given column with the purified components recovered at significantly higher concentration.

=== Reversed-phase liquid chromatography (RP-LC) ===
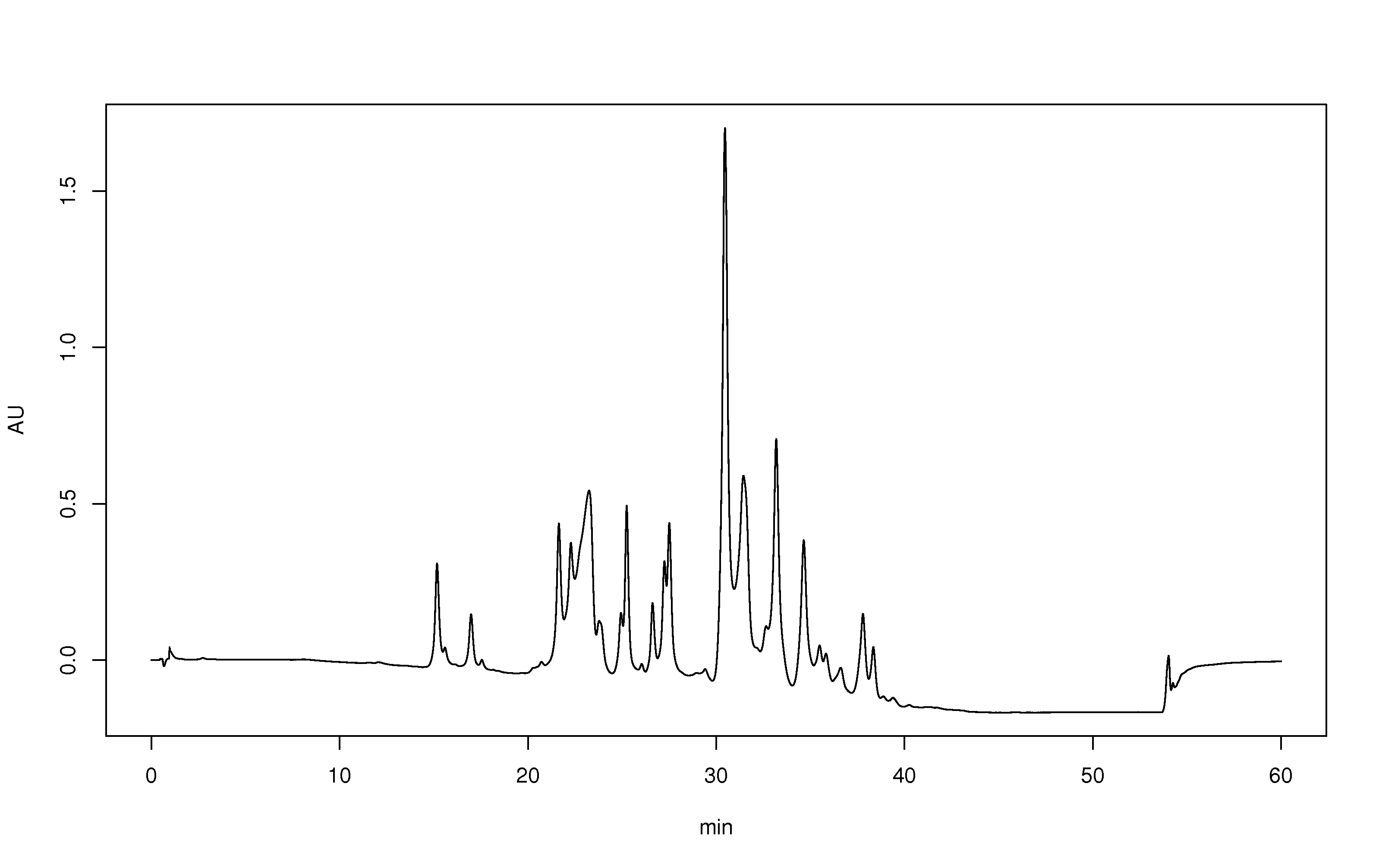
A chromatogram of complex mixture (perfume water) obtained by reversed phase HPLC

Reversed-phase HPLC (RP-HPLC) is the most widespread mode of chromatography. It has a non-polar stationary phase and an aqueous, moderately polar mobile phase. RP-HPLC is so commonly used among the biologists and life science users, that it is often referred to as simply "HPLC". The pharmaceutical industry also regularly employs RP-HPLC to qualify drugs before their release.

In the reversed phase methods, the more hydrophobic a substance is, the longer it is retained in the system. For the retention of organic materials, the stationary phases, are consisted mainly of porous granules of silica gel packed in the column. In shape, they are usually spheres of varying diameters (sub-2, 3, 5, 7, 10 μm), varying pore diameters (60, 100, 150, 300 Å). On their surface are chemically bonded straight chain alkyl ligands, such as C3, C4, C8, C18. The number counts the carbon atoms in a ligand. For example, a C3 ligand is a propyl. The longer the hydrocarbon ligand on the stationary phase, the longer the sample components can be retained. Most of the current methods of separation of biomedical materials use C18 stationary phase, sometimes called by a trade names such as ODS (octadecylsilane) or RP-18 (Reversed Phase 18). To make such stationary phases, one treat the surface of silica gel particles with RMe_{2}SiCl, where R is a straight chain alkyl group such as C_{18}H_{37} or C_{8}H_{17}.

To separate aromatic compounds, or in general compounds with many pi bonds, the stationary phase can have phenyl surface ligands.

At pH < 2, the bond between the ligand and the silica gel may dissolve. At pH > 8, silica itself may dissolve. When solutions at extreme pH are needed, the stationary phase can be made of silica polymerized with organic substances, or hydrophobic organic polymers.

With such stationary phases, retention time is longer for nonpolar molecules, whereas polar molecules elute more readily (emerge early in the analysis). A chromatographer can increase retention times by adding more water to the mobile phase. Since water is highly polar, it makes the nonpolar analyte interact more strongly with nonpolar stationary phase. Similarly, an investigator can decrease retention time by adding more organic nonpolar solvent to the mobile phase.

RP-HPLC operates on the principle of hydrophobic interactions, which originates from the high symmetry in the dipolar water structure and plays the most important role in all processes in life science. RP-HPLC allows the measurement of these interactive forces. The binding of the analyte to the stationary phase is proportional to the contact surface area around the non-polar segment of the analyte molecule upon association with the ligand on the stationary phase. This solvophobic effect is dominated by the force of water for "cavity-reduction" around the analyte and the C_{18}-chain versus the complex of both. The energy released in this process is proportional to the surface tension of the eluent (water: 7.3×10^{−6} J/cm^{2}, methanol: 2.2×10^{−6} J/cm^{2}) and to the hydrophobic surface of the analyte and the ligand respectively. The retention can be decreased by adding a less polar solvent (methanol, acetonitrile) into the mobile phase to reduce the surface tension of water. Gradient elution uses this effect by automatically reducing the polarity and the surface tension of the aqueous mobile phase during the course of the analysis.

Structural properties of the analyte molecule can play an important role in its retention characteristics. In theory, an analyte with a larger hydrophobic surface area (C–H, C–C, and generally non-polar atomic bonds, such as S-S and others) can be retained longer as it does not interact with the water structure. On the other hand, analytes with higher polar surface area (as a result of the presence of polar groups, such as -OH, -NH_{2}, COO^{−} or -NH_{3}^{+} in their structure) are less retained, as they are better integrated into water. The interactions with the stationary phase can also affected by steric effects, or exclusion effects, whereby a component of very large molecule may have only restricted access to the pores of the stationary phase, where the interactions with surface ligands (alkyl chains) take place. Such surface hindrance typically results in less retention.

Retention time increases with more hydrophobic (non-polar) surface area of the molecules. For example, branched chain compounds can elute more rapidly than their corresponding linear isomers, because their overall surface area is lower. Similarly, organic compounds with single C–C bonds frequently elute later than those with a C=C or C≡C, since the double or triple bond makes the molecule more compact than a single bond.

Another important factor is the mobile phase pH since it can change the hydrophobic character of the ionizable analyte. For this reason most methods use a buffering agent, such as sodium phosphate, to control the pH. The effects of controlling for pH and buffers vary by application, but generally improve chromatographic resolution for analytes that are ionizable. Buffers serve multiple purposes:

- Control of pH, which affects the ionization state of the ionizable analytes.
- Affect the charge upon ionizable parts of the surface of the stationary phase. For example, the silica surface in between the bonded phase ligands is usually covered with silanol groups that can deprotonate.
- Act as ion pairing agents to neutralize analyte charge.

If mass spectrometry is used to analyze the eluate, then a volatile organic acid often added to the eluent such as acetic acid or formic acid. Ammonium formate is commonly added to improve detection of certain analytes by the formation of analyte-ammonium adducts, which are more volatile than the analytes themselves.

Trifluoroacetic acid (TFA) as additive to the mobile phase is widely used for complex mixtures of biomedical samples, mostly peptides and proteins, using mostly UV based detectors. TFA also increases retention of analytes such as carboxylic acids, in applications utilizing other detectors (such as UV-VIS), as it is a fairly strong organic acid. However, they are rarely used in mass spectrometry methods, due to residues it can leave in the detector and solvent delivery system, which interfere with the analysis and detection.

The silica particles in reverse-phase are less likely to be damaged compared to silica particles in normal-phase, since they are shielded by surface-bonded hydrophobic ligands. However, most reversed phase columns consist of alkyl derivatized silica particles, and are prone to hydrolysis of the silica at acidic conditions (pH < 2). Also, silica itself dissolves at alkaline onditions (pH > 8). There are selected brands of hybrid or enforced silica based particles of RP columns which can be used at extreme pH conditions. Highly acidic conditions might also corrode the metallic parts of the HPLC equipment.

As a rule, in most cases RP-HPLC columns should be flushed with clean solvent after use to remove residual acids or buffers, and stored in an appropriate composition of solvent. Some biomedical applications require non metallic environment for the optimal separation. For such sensitive cases there is a test for the metal content of a column is to inject a sample which is a mixture of 2,2'- and 4,4'-bipyridine. Because the 2,2'-bipy can chelate the metal, the shape of the peak for the 2,2'-bipy will be distorted (tailed) when metal ions are present on the surface of the silica...

=== Size-exclusion chromatography ===
Size-exclusion chromatography (SEC) separates polymer molecules and biomolecules based on differences in their molecular size (actually by a particle's Stokes radius). The separation process is based on the ability of sample molecules to permeate through the pores of gel spheres, packed inside the column, and is dependent on the relative size of analyte molecules and the respective pore size of the absorbent. The process also relies on the absence of any interactions with the packing material surface.

There are 2 main types of SEC:

1. Gel permeation chromatography (GPC)—separation of synthetic polymers (aqueous or organic soluble), using primarily organic solvents.
2. Gel filtration chromatography (GFC)—separation of water-soluble biopolymers (typically proteins), using primarily aqueous solvents.

The separation principle in SEC is based on the fully, or partially penetrating of the high molecular weight substances of the sample into the porous stationary-phase particles during their transport through column. The mobile-phase eluent is selected in such a way that it totally prevents interactions with the stationary phase's surface. Under these conditions, the smaller the size of the molecule, the more it is able to penetrate inside the pore space and the movement through the column takes longer. On the other hand, the bigger the molecular size, the higher the probability the molecule will not fully penetrate the pores of the stationary phase, and even travel around them, thus, will be eluted earlier. The molecules are separated in order of decreasing molecular weight, with the largest molecules eluting from the column first and smaller molecules eluting later. Molecules larger than the pore size do not enter the pores at all, and elute together as the first peak in the chromatogram and this is called total exclusion volume which defines the exclusion limit for a particular column. Small molecules will permeate fully through the pores of the stationary phase particles and will be eluted last, marking the end of the chromatogram, and may appear as a total penetration marker.

In biomedical sciences it is generally considered as a low resolution chromatography and thus it is often reserved for the final, "polishing" step of the purification. It is also useful for determining the tertiary structure and quaternary structure of purified proteins. SEC is used primarily for the analysis of large molecules such as proteins or polymers. SEC works also in a preparative way by trapping the smaller molecules in the pores of a particles. The larger molecules simply pass by the pores as they are too large to enter the pores. Larger molecules therefore flow through the column quicker than smaller molecules: that is, the smaller the molecule, the longer the retention time.

This technique is widely used for the molecular weight determination of polysaccharides. SEC is the official technique of the European Pharmacopoeia for the molecular weight comparison of different commercially available low-molecular weight heparins.

=== Ion-exchange chromatography ===
Ion-exchange chromatography (IEC) or ion chromatography (IC) is an analytical technique for the separation and determination of ionic solutes in aqueous samples from environmental and industrial origins such as metal industry, industrial waste water, in biological systems, pharmaceutical samples, food, etc.

In IEC, there are electrically charged sites bound to the stationary phase. Solute ions charged the same as the ions on the column are repulsed and elute without retention, while solute ions charged oppositely to the charged sites of the column are retained on it. In general, ions of higher charge and smaller radius are more strongly retained. Solute ions that are retained on the column can be eluted from it by changing the mobile phase composition, such as increasing its salt concentration and pH, or increasing the stationary phase temperature, etc.

Types of ion exchangers include polystyrene resins, cellulose and dextran ion exchangers (gels), and controlled-pore glass or porous silica gel. Polystyrene resins allow cross linkage, which increases the stability of the chain. Higher cross linkage reduces swerving, which increases the equilibration time and ultimately improves selectivity. Cellulose and dextran ion exchangers possess larger pore sizes and low charge densities making them suitable for protein separation.

An increase in counter ion (with respect to the functional groups in resins) concentration reduces the retention time, as it creates a strong competition with the solute ions. A decrease in pH reduces the retention time in cation exchange while an increase in pH reduces the retention time in anion exchange. By lowering the pH of the solvent in a cation exchange column, for instance, more hydrogen ions are available to compete for positions on the anionic stationary phase, thereby eluting weakly bound cations.

This form of chromatography is widely used in the following applications: water purification, preconcentration of trace components, ligand-exchange chromatography, ion-exchange chromatography of proteins, high-pH anion-exchange chromatography of carbohydrates and oligosaccharides, and others.

=== Affinity chromatography ===
High performance affinity chromatography (HPAC) works by passing a sample solution through a column packed with a stationary phase that contains an immobilized biologically active ligand. The ligand is in fact a substrate that has a specific binding affinity for the target molecule in the sample solution. The target molecule binds to the ligand, while the other molecules in the sample solution pass through the column, having little or no retention. The target molecule is then eluted from the column using a suitable elution buffer.

This chromatographic process relies on the capability of the bonded active substances to form stable, specific, and reversible complexes thanks to their biological recognition of certain specific sample components. The formation of these complexes involves the participation of common molecular forces such as the Van der Waals interaction, electrostatic interaction, dipole-dipole interaction, hydrophobic interaction, and the hydrogen bond. An efficient, specific bond is formed by a simultaneous and concerted action of several of these forces in the complementary binding sites.

=== Aqueous normal-phase chromatography ===
Aqueous normal-phase chromatography (ANP) is also called hydrophilic interaction liquid chromatography (HILIC). This is a chromatographic technique which encompasses the mobile phase region between reversed-phase chromatography (RP) and organic normal phase chromatography (ONP). HILIC is used to achieve unique selectivity for hydrophilic compounds, showing normal phase elution order, using "reversed-phase solvents", i.e., relatively polar mostly non-aqueous solvents in the mobile phase. Many biological molecules, especially those found in biological fluids, are small polar compounds that do not retain well by reversed phase-HPLC. This has made hydrophilic interaction LC (HILIC) an attractive alternative and useful approach for analysis of polar molecules. Additionally, because HILIC is routinely used with traditional aqueous mixtures with polar organic solvents such as ACN and methanol, it can be easily coupled to MS.

== Isocratic and gradient elution ==
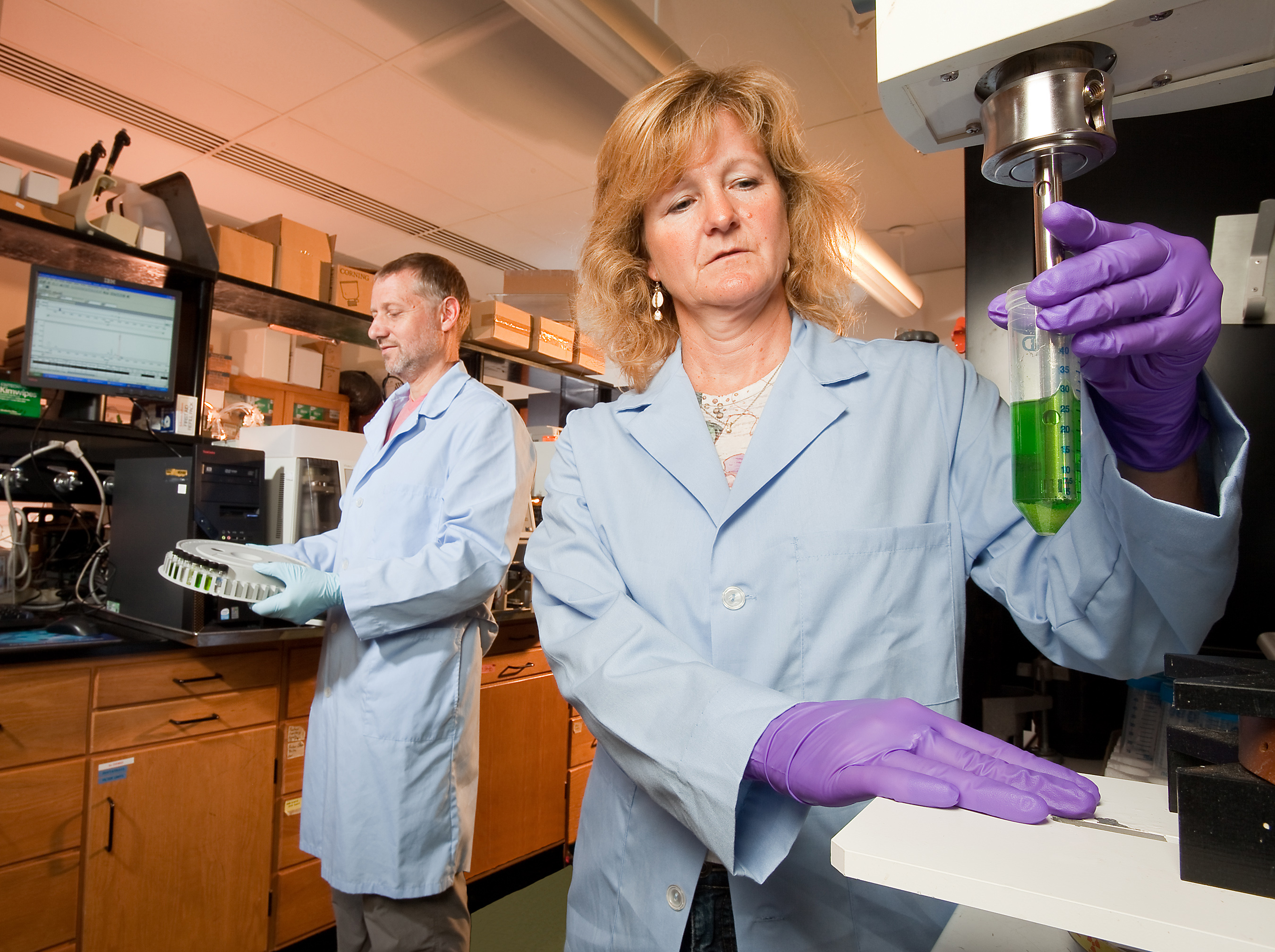
At the ARS Natural Products Utilization Research Unit in Oxford, MS., a support scientist (r) extracts plant pigments that will be analyzed by a plant physiologist (l) using an HPLC system.

During the separation, the mobile phase composition may stay the same, or change. If it stays the same, the process is termed isocratic (meaning constant composition). The word was coined by Csaba Horvath who was one of the pioneers of HPLC.

If it changes, then the process is termed a gradient elution. For example, a gradient can start at 10% methanol in water, and end at 90% methanol in water after 20 minutes. The two components of the mobile phase are typically termed "A" and "B"; A is the "weak" solvent which allows the solute to elute only slowly, while B is the "strong" solvent which rapidly elutes the solutes from the column. In reversed-phase chromatography, solvent A is often water or an aqueous buffer, while B is an organic solvent miscible with water, such as acetonitrile, methanol, THF, or isopropanol.

In isocratic elution, peak width increases with retention time linearly according to the equation for N, the number of theoretical plates. This can be a major disadvantage when analyzing a sample that contains analytes with a wide range of retention factors. Using a weaker mobile phase, the runtime is lengthened and results in slowly eluting peaks to be broad, leading to reduced sensitivity. A stronger mobile phase would improve issues of runtime and broadening of later peaks but results in diminished peak separation, especially for quickly eluting analytes which may have insufficient time to fully resolve. This issue is addressed through the changing mobile phase composition of gradient elution.

A schematic of gradient elution. Increasing mobile phase strength sequentially elutes analytes having varying interaction strength with the stationary phase.

By starting from a weaker mobile phase and strengthening it during the runtime, gradient elution decreases the retention of the later-eluting components so that they elute faster, giving narrower (and taller) peaks for most components, while also allowing for the adequate separation of earlier-eluting components. This also improves the peak shape for tailed peaks, as the increasing concentration of the organic eluent pushes the tailing part of a peak forward. This also increases the peak height (the peak looks "sharper"), which is important in trace analysis. The gradient program may include sudden "step" increases in the percentage of the organic component, or different slopes at different times – all according to the desire for optimum separation in minimum time.

In isocratic elution, the retention order does not change if the column dimensions (length and inner diameter) change – that is, the peaks elute in the same order. In gradient elution, however, the elution order may change as the dimensions or flow rate change. if they are no scaled down or up according to the change

The driving force in reversed phase chromatography originates in the high order of the water structure. The role of the organic component of the mobile phase is to reduce this high order and thus reduce the retarding strength of the aqueous component.

== Parameters ==
=== Theoretical ===
The theory of general chromatography applies to HPLC. This theory is the basis for system-suitability tests of the United States Pharmacopoeia, which are a set of quantitative criteria for how suitable a HPLC system is to the required analysis at any step of it.

This relation is also represented as a normalized unit-less factor known as the retention factor, or retention parameter, which is the experimental measurement of the capacity ratio, as shown in the Figure of Performance Criteria as well. t_{R} is the retention time of the specific component and t_{0} is the time it takes for a non-retained substance to elute through the system without any retention, thus it is called the Void Time.

The ratio between the retention factors, k', of every two adjacent peaks in the chromatogram is used in the evaluation of the degree of separation between them, and is called selectivity factor, α, as shown in the Performance Criteria graph.

The plate count N as a criterion for system efficiency was developed for isocratic conditions, i.e., a constant mobile phase composition throughout the run. In gradient conditions, where the mobile phase changes with time during the chromatographic run, it is more appropriate to use the parameter peak capacity P_{c} as a measure for the system efficiency. The definition of peak capacity in chromatography is the number of peaks that can be separated within a retention window for a specific pre-defined resolution factor, usually ~1. It could also be envisioned as the runtime measured in number of peaks' average widths. The equation is shown in the Figure of the performance criteria. In this equation tg is the gradient time and w(ave) is the average peaks width at the base.

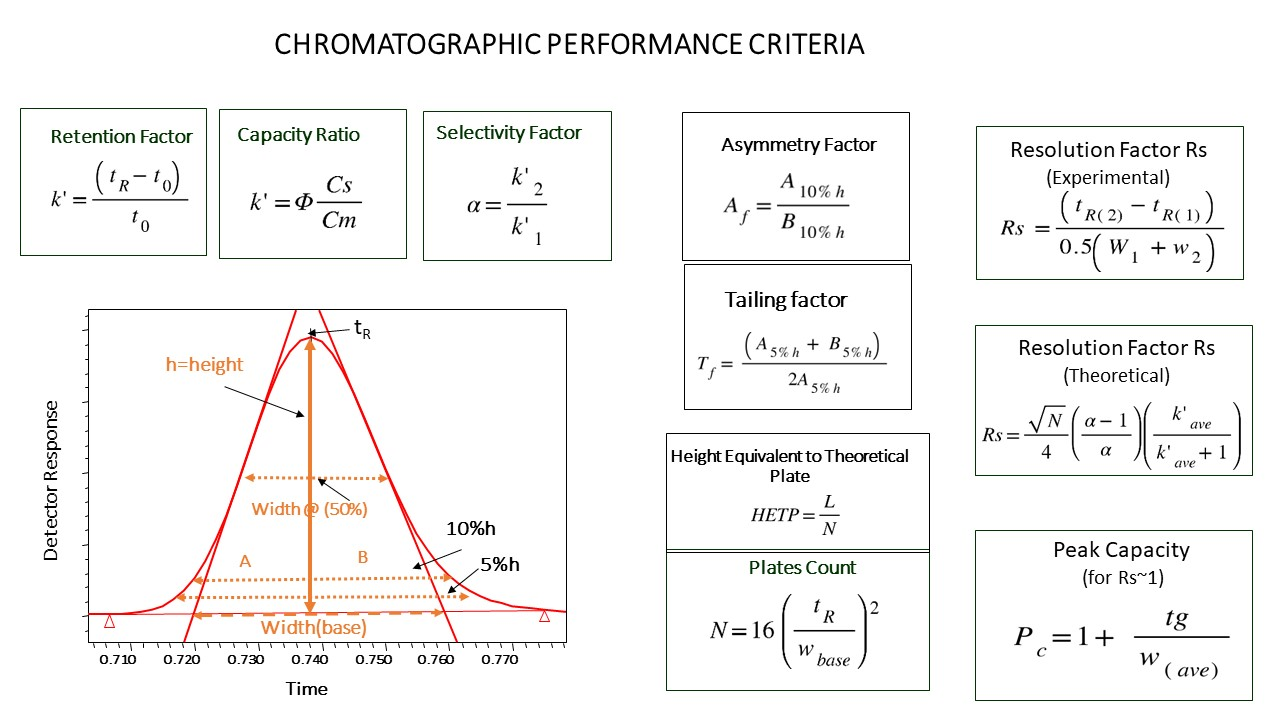
The quantitative parameters and equations which determine the extent of performance of the chromatographic system

The parameters are largely derived from two sets of chromatographic theory: plate theory (as part of partition chromatography), and the rate theory of chromatography / van Deemter equation. Of course, they can be put in practice through analysis of HPLC chromatograms, although rate theory is considered the more accurate theory.

They are analogous to the calculation of retention factor for a paper chromatography separation, but describes how well HPLC separates a mixture into two or more components that are detected as peaks (bands) on a chromatogram. The HPLC parameters are the: efficiency factor(N), the retention factor (kappa prime), and the separation factor (alpha). Together the factors are variables in a resolution equation, which describes how well two components' peaks separated or overlapped each other. These parameters are mostly only used for describing HPLC reversed phase and HPLC normal phase separations, since those separations tend to be more subtle than other HPLC modes (e.g., ion exchange and size exclusion).

Void volume is the amount of space in a column that is occupied by solvent. It is the space within the column that is outside of the column's internal packing material. Void volume is measured on a chromatogram as the first component peak detected, which is usually the solvent that was present in the sample mixture; ideally the sample solvent flows through the column without interacting with the column, but is still detectable as distinct from the HPLC solvent. The void volume is used as a correction factor.

Efficiency factor (N) practically measures how sharp component peaks on the chromatogram are, as ratio of the component peak's area ("retention time") relative to the width of the peaks at their widest point (at the baseline). Peaks that are tall, sharp, and relatively narrow indicate that separation method efficiently removed a component from a mixture; high efficiency. Efficiency is very dependent upon the HPLC column and the HPLC method used. Efficiency factor is synonymous with plate number, and the 'number of theoretical plates'.

Retention factor (kappa prime) measures how long a component of the mixture stuck to the column, measured by the area under the curve of its peak in a chromatogram (since HPLC chromatograms are a function of time). Each chromatogram peak will have its own retention factor (e.g., kappa1 for the retention factor of the first peak). This factor may be corrected for by the void volume of the column.

Separation factor (alpha) is a relative comparison on how well two neighboring components of the mixture were separated (i.e., two neighboring bands on a chromatogram). This factor is defined in terms of a ratio of the retention factors of a pair of neighboring chromatogram peaks, and may also be corrected for by the void volume of the column. The greater the separation factor value is over 1.0, the better the separation, until about 2.0 beyond which an HPLC method is probably not needed for separation. Resolution equations relate the three factors such that high efficiency and separation factors improve the resolution of component peaks in an HPLC separation.

=== Internal diameter ===
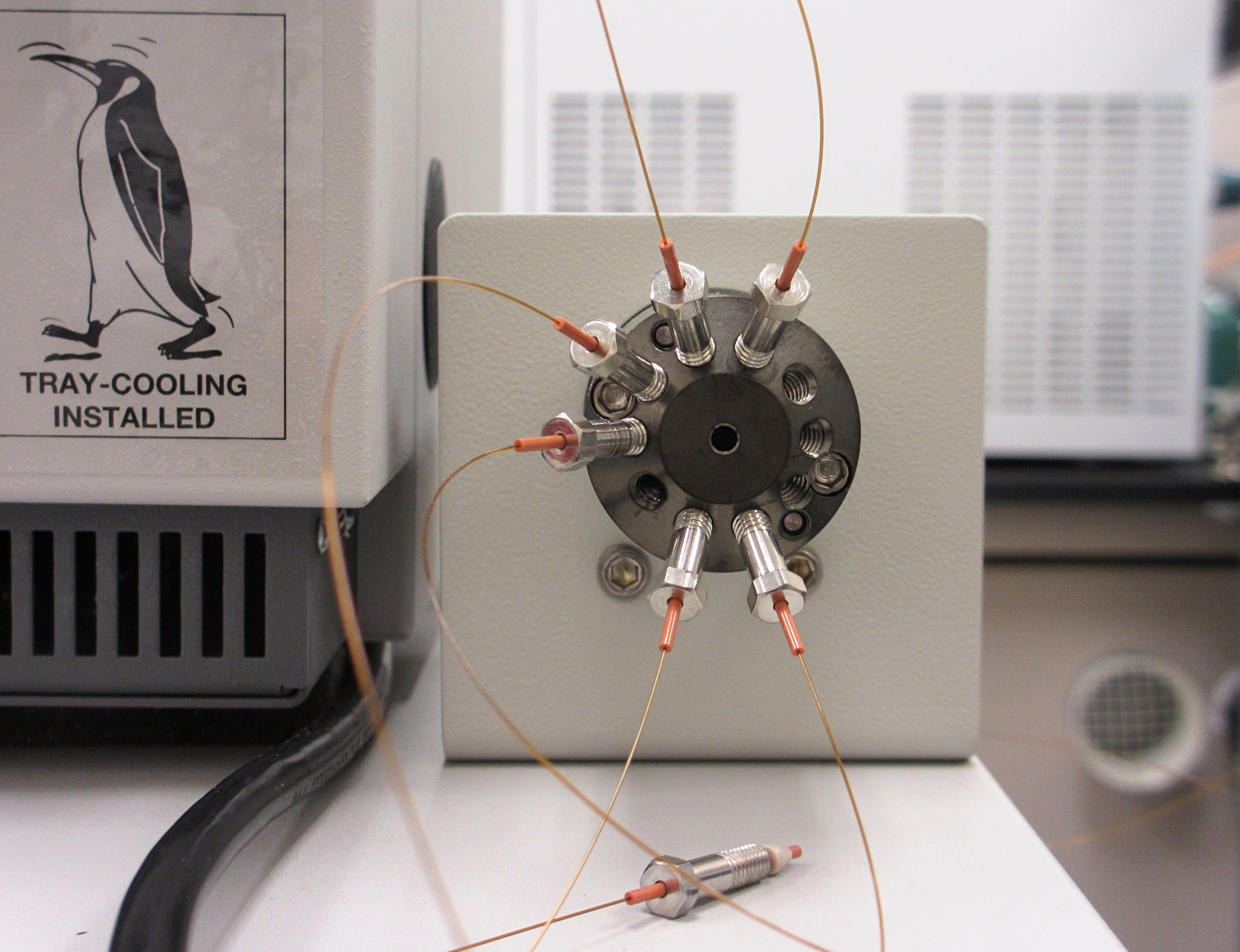
Tubing on a nano-liquid chromatography (nano-LC) system, used for very low flow capacities

The internal diameter (ID) of an HPLC column is an important parameter. It can influence the detection response when reduced due to the reduced lateral diffusion of the solute band. It can also affect the separation selectivity, when flow rate and injection volumes are not scaled down or up proportionally to the smaller or larger diameter used, both in the isocratic and in gradient modes. It determines the quantity of analyte that can be loaded onto the column. Larger diameter columns are usually seen in preparative applications, such as the purification of a drug product for later use. Low-ID columns have improved sensitivity and lower solvent consumption in the recent ultra-high performance liquid chromatography (UHPLC).

Larger ID columns (over 10 mm) are used to purify usable amounts of material because of their large loading capacity.

Analytical scale columns (4.6 mm) have been the most common type of columns, though narrower columns are rapidly gaining in popularity. They are used in traditional quantitative analysis of samples and often use a UV-Vis absorbance detector.

Narrow-bore columns (1–2 mm) are used for applications when more sensitivity is desired either with special UV-vis detectors, fluorescence detection or with other detection methods like liquid chromatography-mass spectrometry

Capillary columns (under 0.3 mm) are used almost exclusively with alternative detection means such as mass spectrometry. They are usually made from fused silica capillaries, rather than the stainless steel tubing that larger columns employ.

=== Particle size ===
Most traditional HPLC is performed with the stationary phase attached to the outside of small spherical silica particles (very small beads). These particles come in a variety of sizes with 5 μm beads being the most common. Smaller particles generally provide more surface area and better separations, but the pressure required for optimum linear velocity increases by the inverse of the particle diameter squared.

According to the equations of the column velocity, efficiency and backpressure, reducing the particle diameter by half and keeping the size of the column the same, will double the column velocity and efficiency; but four times increase the backpressure. And the small particles HPLC also can decrease the width broadening. Larger particles are used in preparative HPLC (column diameters 5 cm up to >30 cm) and for non-HPLC applications such as solid-phase extraction.

=== Pore size ===
Many stationary phases are porous to provide greater surface area. Small pores provide greater surface area while larger pore size has better kinetics, especially for larger analytes. For example, a protein which is only slightly smaller than a pore might enter the pore but does not easily leave once inside.

=== Pump pressure ===
Pumps vary in pressure capacity, but their performance is measured on their ability to yield a consistent and reproducible volumetric flow rate. Pressure may reach as high as 60 MPa (6000 lbf/in^{2}), or about 600 atmospheres. Modern HPLC systems have been improved to work at much higher pressures, and therefore are able to use much smaller particle sizes in the columns (<2 μm). These "ultra high performance liquid chromatography" systems or UHPLCs, which could also be known as ultra high pressure chromatography systems, can work at up to 120 MPa (17,405 lbf/in^{2}), or about 1200 atmospheres. The term "UPLC" is a trademark of the Waters Corporation, but is sometimes used to refer to the more general technique of UHPLC.

=== Detectors ===
HPLC detectors fall into two main categories: universal or selective. Universal detectors typically measure a bulk property (e.g., refractive index) by measuring a difference of a physical property between the mobile phase and mobile phase with solute while selective detectors measure a solute property (e.g., UV-Vis absorbance) by simply responding to the physical or chemical property of the solute. HPLC most commonly uses a UV-Vis absorbance detector; however, a wide range of other chromatography detectors can be used. A universal detector that complements UV-Vis absorbance detection is the charged aerosol detector (CAD). A kind of commonly utilized detector includes refractive index detectors, which provide readings by measuring the changes in the refractive index of the eluant as it moves through the flow cell. In certain cases, it is possible to use multiple detectors, for example LCMS normally combines UV-Vis with a mass spectrometer.

When used with an electrochemical detector (ECD) the HPLC-ECD selectively detects neurotransmitters such as: norepinephrine, dopamine, serotonin, glutamate, GABA, acetylcholine and others in neurochemical analysis research applications. The HPLC-ECD detects neurotransmitters to the femtomolar range. Other methods to detect neurotransmitters include liquid chromatography-mass spectrometry, ELISA, or radioimmunoassays.

=== Autosamplers ===
Large numbers of samples can be automatically injected onto an HPLC system, by the use of HPLC autosamplers. In addition, HPLC autosamplers have an injection volume and technique which is exactly the same for each injection, consequently they provide a high degree of injection volume precision. It is possible to enable sample stirring within the sampling-chamber, thus promoting homogeneity.

== Applications ==
=== Manufacturing ===
HPLC has many applications in both laboratory and clinical science. It is a common technique used in pharmaceutical development, as it is a dependable way to obtain and ensure product purity. While HPLC can produce extremely high quality (pure) products, it is not always the primary method used in the production of bulk drug materials. According to the European pharmacopoeia, HPLC is used in only 15.5% of syntheses. However, it plays a role in 44% of syntheses in the United States pharmacopoeia. This could possibly be due to differences in monetary and time constraints, as HPLC on a large scale can be an expensive technique. An increase in specificity, precision, and accuracy that occurs with HPLC unfortunately corresponds to an increase in cost.

=== Legal ===
This technique is also used for detection of illicit drugs in various samples. The most common method of drug detection has been an immunoassay. This method is much more convenient. However, convenience comes at the cost of specificity and coverage of a wide range of drugs, therefore, HPLC has been used as well as an alternative method. As HPLC is a method of determining (and possibly increasing) purity, using HPLC alone in evaluating concentrations of drugs was somewhat insufficient. Therefore, HPLC in this context is often performed in conjunction with mass spectrometry. Using liquid chromatography-mass spectrometry (LC-MS) instead of gas chromatography-mass spectrometry (GC-MS) circumvents the necessity for derivitizing with acetylating or alkylation agents, which can be a burdensome extra step. LC-MS has been used to detect a variety of agents like doping agents, drug metabolites, glucuronide conjugates, amphetamines, opioids, cocaine, BZDs, ketamine, LSD, cannabis, and pesticides. Performing HPLC in conjunction with mass spectrometry reduces the absolute need for standardizing HPLC experimental runs.

=== Research ===
Similar assays can be performed for research purposes, detecting concentrations of potential clinical candidates like anti-fungal and asthma drugs. This technique is obviously useful in observing multiple species in collected samples, as well, but requires the use of standard solutions when information about species identity is sought out. It is used as a method to confirm results of synthesis reactions, as purity is essential in this type of research. However, mass spectrometry is still the more reliable way to identify species.

=== Medical and health sciences ===
Medical use of HPLC typically use mass spectrometer (MS) as the detector, so the technique is called LC-MS or LC-MS/MS for tandem MS, where two types of MS are operated sequentially. When the HPLC instrument is connected to more than one detector, it is called a hyphenated LC system. Pharmaceutical applications are the major users of HPLC, LC-MS and LC-MS/MS. This includes drug development and pharmacology, which is the scientific study of the effects of drugs and chemicals on living organisms, personalized medicine, public health and diagnostics. While urine is the most common medium for analyzing drug concentrations, blood serum is the sample collected for most medical analyses with HPLC. One of the most important roles of LC-MS and LC-MS/MS in the clinical lab is the Newborn Screening (NBS) for metabolic disorders and follow-up diagnostics. The infants' samples come in the shape of dried blood spot (DBS), which is simple to prepare and transport, enabling safe and accessible diagnostics, both locally and globally.

Other methods of detection of molecules that are useful for clinical studies have been tested against HPLC, namely immunoassays. In one example of this, competitive protein binding assays (CPBA) and HPLC were compared for sensitivity in detection of vitamin D. Useful for diagnosing vitamin D deficiencies in children, it was found that sensitivity and specificity of this CPBA reached only 40% and 60%, respectively, of the capacity of HPLC. While an expensive tool, the accuracy of HPLC is nearly unparalleled.

== See also ==
- History of chromatography
- Capillary electrochromatography
- Column chromatography
- Csaba Horváth
- Ion chromatography
- Micellar liquid chromatography
