= Gas chromatography ion detector =

Purification instrument used to detect and separate ionized materials from solutions

Many gas chromatograph detectors are ion detectors with varying methods of ionizing the components eluting from the gas chromatograph's column.

An ion detector is analogous to a capacitor or vacuum tube. It can be envisioned as two metal grids separated by air with inverse charges placed on them. An electric potential difference (voltage) exists between the two grids. After components are ionized in the detector, they enter the region between the two grids, causing current to pass from one to the other. This current is amplified and is the signal generated by the detector. The higher the concentration of the component, the more ions are generated, and the greater the current.

Some early FIDs actually used two metal grids as their ion detectors. However, more efficient designs have been developed, so few current ion-type detectors use two metal grids. But the principle is the same, and it can be easiest to think of the detector in this manner.

== Types of Ion Detectors ==
- Flame ionization detector (FID) -- uses a flame to produce ions
- Electron capture detector (ECD) -- uses beta radiation
- Photo-ionization detector (PID) -- uses UV light to produce ions
- Helium ionization detector (HID) -- uses a radioactive source to produce helium ions, which in turn ionize the components
- Discharge ionization detector (DID) -- uses an electric spark source to produce helium ions, which in turn ionize the components
- Pulsed discharge ionization detector (PDD) -- similar to a Discharge ionization detector (DID), but uses a different sort of spark

== See also ==
- Gas Chromatograph
- Chromatography detector
