= Post-column oxidation–reduction reactor =

A post-column oxidation-reduction reactor is a chemical reactor that performs derivatization to improve the quantitative measurement of organic analytes. It is used in gas chromatography (GC), after the column and before a flame ionization detector (FID), to make the response factor of the detector uniform for all carbon-based species.

The reactor contains catalysts that converts all of the carbon atoms of organic molecules in GC column effluents into methane before reaching the FID. As a result, all carbon atoms are detected equally, and therefore calibration standards for each compound are not needed. It can improve the response of the FID to many compounds with poor or low response, including carbon monoxide (CO), carbon dioxide (CO_{2}), hydrogen cyanide (HCN), formamide (CH_{3}NO), formaldehyde (CH_{2}O), and formic acid (CH_{2}O_{2}).

== History ==
The concept of using a post-column catalytic reactor to enhance the response of the FID was first developed for the reduction of carbon dioxide and carbon monoxide to methane using a nickel catalyst. The reaction device, often referred to as a methanizer, is limited to the conversion of carbon dioxide and carbon monoxide to methane, and the catalysts are poisoned by sulfur and ethylene among others.

Using a combustion reactor prior to the reduction reactor allows other carbon-containing chemicals to benefit from enhancement in FID detection. In the combustion step, all carbon is converted to carbon dioxide, allowing it to be converted to methane for FID detection regardless of its original chemical form.

== Operating principle ==
=== Chemical reactions ===
The reactor operates by converting organic analytes after GC separation into methane prior to detection by FID. The oxidation and reduction reactions occur sequentially, wherein the organic compound is first combusted to produce carbon dioxide, which is subsequently reduced to methane. The following reactions illustrate the oxidation/reduction process for formic acid.

$\ce{HCO2H + 1/2O2 <=> CO2 + H2O}$

$\ce{CO2 + 4H2 <=> CH4 + 2H2O}$

The reactions are fast compared to the time scales typical of gas chromatography, resulting in manageable peak broadening and tailing. Elements other than carbon, as CH_{4}, are not ionized in the flame and thus do not contribute to the FID signal.
