= Tatiana Rynearson =

American oceanographer

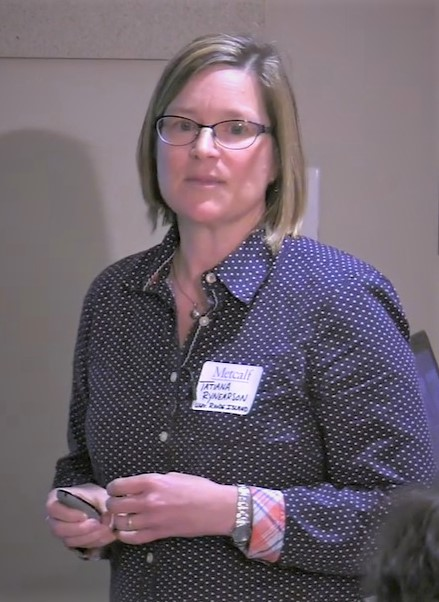
- Rynearson lectures at the University of Rhode Island Metcalf Institute in 2020
- Born: Ohio
- Education: University of Washington; Brown University
- Scientific career
- Workplaces: University of Rhode Island; University of Washington
- Thesis: Clonal diversity, population differentiation and bloom dynamics in the centric diatom, Ditylum brightwellii (2003)

Tatiana Rynearson is an American oceanographer who is a professor at the University of Rhode Island. Her research considers plankton diversity and abundance. Rynearson has been on several research cruises, including trips to the North Sea, Puget Sound, the Gulf of Mexico and the North Atlantic.

== Early life and education ==
Rynearson grew up in Ohio. She became interested in aquatic science as a junior at high school. She was an undergraduate student at Brown University, where she studied aquatic sciences. She was a graduate student at the University of Washington, where she studied the bloom dynamics in the centric diatom Ditylum brightwellii. She remained at Washington as a postdoctoral researcher until she was appointed to the faculty at the University of Rhode Island in 2005.

== Research and career ==
Rynearson studies microbial ecology and evolutionary biology. She is particularly interested in diatoms - microscopically sized ocean plants, which help the ocean regulate global climate. She has studied the diversity of diatoms in the Narragansett Bay in Rhode Island. The Plankton of Narragansett Bay is one of the world's longest plankton studies, and has been collecting data every week since the 1950s. In particular, she created genetic analysis methods that allow her to see the circuitry inside cells.

In 2016, Rynearson was part of an expedition on the Nathaniel B. Palmer research vessel. The mission departed from Punta Arenas with a specific focus on diatoms in the Southern Ocean. The information she collected as combined with genetic information provided insight in how polar diatoms were impacted by environmental change.

Rynearson has been involved with the Metcalf Institute, which focuses on science communication. Rynearson was supported by the National Science Foundation ADVANCE program.

== Selected publications ==
- E. Virginia Armbrust; John A. Berges; Chris Bowler; et al. (1 October 2004). "The Genome of the Diatom Thalassiosira Pseudonana: Ecology, Evolution, and Metabolism". Science. 306 (5693): 79–86. Bibcode:2004Sci...306...79A. doi:10.1126/science.1101156. ISSN 0036-8075. PMID 15459382. Wikidata Q22065811.
- Chris Bowler; Andrew E. Allen; Jonathan H. Badger; et al. (15 October 2008). "The Phaeodactylum genome reveals the evolutionary history of diatom genomes". Nature. 456 (7219): 239–244. Bibcode:2008Natur.456..239B. doi:10.1038/nature07410. ISSN 1476-4687. PMID 18923393. Wikidata Q22122217.
- Patrick John Keeling; Fabien Burki; Heather M Wilcox; et al. (24 June 2014). "The Marine Microbial Eukaryote Transcriptome Sequencing Project (MMETSP): illuminating the functional diversity of eukaryotic life in the oceans through transcriptome sequencing". PLOS Biology. 12 (6) e1001889. doi:10.1371/journal.pbio.1001889. ISSN 1544-9173. PMC 4068987. PMID 24959919. Wikidata Q30833097.
- Sonya T Dyhrman; Bethany D Jenkins; Tatiana A Rynearson; et al. (2012). "The transcriptome and proteome of the diatom Thalassiosira pseudonana reveal a diverse phosphorus stress response". PLOS One. 7 (3) e33768. Bibcode:2012PLoSO...733768D. doi:10.1371/journal.pone.0033768. ISSN 1932-6203. PMC 3315573. PMID 22479440. Wikidata Q28481848.
