= Unresolved complex mixture =

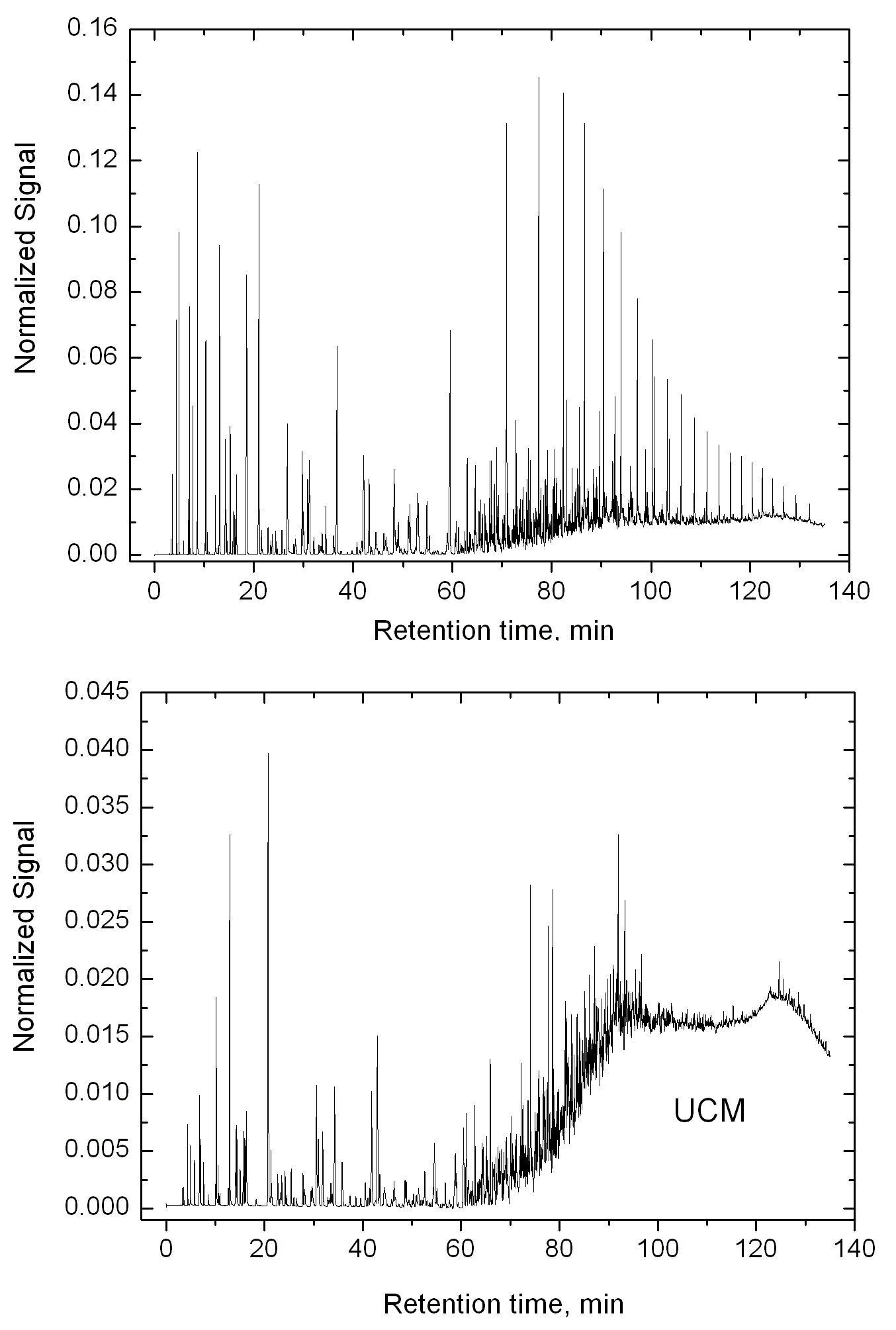
Examples of non-biodegraded crude oil (top) and a heavily biodegraded one (bottom) with the UCM area indicated. Both chromatograms have been normalized so that their integrals are equal to unity.

Unresolved complex mixture (UCM), or hump, is a feature frequently observed in gas chromatographic (GC) data of crude oils and extracts from organisms exposed to oil.

The reason for the UCM hump appearance is that GC cannot resolve and identify a significant part of the hydrocarbons in crude oils. The resolved components appear as peaks while the UCM appears as a large background/platform. In non-biodegraded oils the UCM may comprise less than 50% of the total area of the chromatogram, while in biodegraded oils this figure can rise to over 90%. UCMs are also observed in certain refined fractions such as lubricating oils and references therein.

In attempting to determine "the processes that regulate the fate of petroleum following release to the environment,” geochemist Christopher M. Reddy of Woods Hole Oceanographic Institution invented an application of comprehensive two-dimensional gas chromatography (GCxGC) that resolves UMPs and that he patented. As it degrades in a marine environment, oil undergoes complex transformations, producing residues composed of extremely complex organic mixtures that accumulate in such “protective environments” as fiddler crabs and marsh grass. These residues form the majority of the unresolved complex mixture (UCM) resulting from the breakdown of crude oils that GC had previously been unable to resolve but which Reddy’s novel GCxGC application has made accessible, enabling determination of “the underlying processes controlling petroleum fate” as it degrades in a marine environment.

The technique Reddy invented is now widely applied in the characterization of petroleum in environmental samples as well as in analyses of other complex organic mixtures, and, because of it, GCxGC has transitioned from “a niche qualitative analysis tool to a robust quantitative technique.” For this innovative work, Reddy was awarded the Clair C. Patterson Award in 2014 by the Geochemical Society for "an innovative breakthrough in environmental geochemistry of fundamental significance within the last decade, particularly in service to society. To be viewed as innovative, the work must show a high degree of creativity and/or be a fundamental departure from usual practice while contributing significantly to understanding in environmental geochemistry."

Reddy's first investigation into oil spills employing the new method was at the West Falmouth Harbor of Massachusetts, where the barge Florida had run aground in 1969, spilling 175,000 gallons of heating oil. Reddy and his team studied the area from 1999 to 2008, identifying chemical and biological effects that persisted even after 30 years. According to geologist and biogeoscientist Timothy Eglinton, at the time Reddy received the Patterson Award, the "string of papers" he and his team members had published "on this oil spill ... collectively represent[ed] amongst the most comprehensive, sustained and multifaceted investigations of the environmental fate of a single petroleum spill" published to date, thanks to Reddy's use of the novel GCxGC method he had pioneered.

One reason why it is important to study the nature of UCMs is that some have been shown to contain toxic components, but only a small range of known petrogenic toxicants, such as the USEPA list of 16 polycyclic aromatic hydrocarbons (PAHs), tend to be routinely monitored in the environment.

Analysis of the hydrocarbon fraction of crude oils by GC reveals a complex mixture containing many thousands of individual components. Components that are resolved by GC have been extensively studied e.g. However, despite the application of many analytical techniques the remaining components have, until very recently, proved difficult to separate due to the large numbers of co-eluting compounds. Gas chromatograms of mature oils have prominent n-alkane peaks which distract attention from the underlying unresolved complex mixture (UCM) of hydrocarbons often referred to as the ‘hump’. Processes such as weathering and biodegradation result in a relative enrichment of the UCM component by removal of resolved components and the creation of new compounds. It has been shown that both resolved and unresolved components of oils are subject to concurrent biodegradation, i.e. it is not a sequential process, but due to the recalcitrant nature of some components, the rates of biodegradation of individual compounds greatly varies. The UCM fraction often represents the major component of hydrocarbons within hydrocarbon-polluted sediments (see reference therein) and biota e.g. A number of studies has now demonstrated that aqueous exposure to components within the UCM can affect the health of marine organisms, including possible hormonal disruption, and high concentrations of environmental UCMs have been strongly implicated with impaired health in wild populations.

== Weathering and biodegradion of oils within the marine environment ==
Environmental UCMs result from highly degraded petroleum hydrocarbons and once formed they can stay largely unchanged in sediments for many years. For example, in 1969 a diesel oil spill contaminated saltmarsh sediment within Wild Harbor River, US; by 1973 only a baseline hump was observed, which remained largely unchanged within the anaerobic sediment for the next 30 years. In a study of the potential for UCM-dominated oil to be further degraded, it was concluded that even using bacteria specifically adapted for complex UCM hydrocarbons in conjunction with nutrient enrichment, biodegradation rates would still be relatively slow. Bacterial degradation of hydrocarbons is complex and will depend on environmental conditions (e.g. aerobic or anaerobic, temperature, nutrient availability, available species of bacteria etc.).

== Analysis of UCM hydrocarbons ==
A relatively recent analytical tool that has been used for the separation of UCMs is comprehensive two-dimensional GC (GCxGC). This powerful technique, introduced by Liu and Phillips combines two GC columns with different separation mechanisms: typically a primary column that separates compounds based on volatility coupled to a second short column that separates by polarity. The two columns are connected by a modulator, a device that traps, focuses and re-injects the peaks that elute from the first column into the second column. Each peak eluting from the first column (which may be a number of co-eluting peaks) is further separated on the second column. The second separation is rapid, allowing the introduction of subsequent fractions from the first column without mutual interference. Dallüge et al. reviewed the principles, advantages and main characteristics of this technique. One of the main advantages is the very high separation power, making the technique ideal for unravelling the composition of complex mixtures. Another important feature of GC×GC is that chemically related compounds show up as ordered structures within the chromatograms, i.e. isomers appear as distinct groups in the chromatogram as a result of their similar interaction with the second dimension column phase. The use of GC×GC for the characterization of complex petrochemical mixtures has been extensively reviewed. Most research into petrochemical hydrocarbons using GC×GC has utilised flame ionisation detection (FID) but mass spectrometry (MS) is necessary to obtain the structural information necessary to identify unknown compounds. Currently, only time-of-flight MS (ToF-MS) can deliver the high acquisition rates required to analyse GC×GC.

== Toxicity of UCM hydrocarbon components ==
There is compelling evidence that components within some UCMs are toxic to marine organisms. The clearance rate (also known as feeding feed) of mussels was reduced by 40% following exposure to a monoaromatic UCM derived from a Norwegian crude oil. The toxicity of monoaromatic UCM components was further evidenced by an elegant set of experiments using transplantations of clean and polluted mussels. Recent analysis by GC×GC-ToF-MS of UCMs extracted from the mussel tissues, has shown that they contain a vast array of both known and unknown compounds. The comparative analysis of UCMs extracted from mussels known to possess high, moderate and low Scope for Growth (SfG), a measure of the capacity for growth and reproduction, revealed that branched alkylbenzenes represented the largest structural class within the UCM of mussels with low SfG; also, branched isomers of alkyltetralins, alkylindanes and alkylindenes were prominent in the stressed mussels. Laboratory toxicity tests using both commercially available and specially synthesised compounds revealed that such branched alkylated structures were capable of producing the observed poor health of the mussels. The reversible effects observed in mussels following exposure to the UCM hydrocarbons identified to date are consistent with non-specific narcosis (also known as baseline) mode of action of toxicity. There is no evidence that toxic UCM components can biomagnify through the food chain. Crabs (Carcinus maenas) that were fed a diet of mussels contaminated with environmentally realistic concentrations of branched alkylbenzenes, suffered behavioural disruption but only a small concentration of the compounds were retained in the midgut of the crabs. Within marsh sediments still contaminated with high concentrations of UCM hydrocarbons from the Florida barge oil spill in 1969 (see above,) the behaviour and feeding of fiddler crabs (Uca pugnax) was reported to be affected.

== Polar UCMs ==
Much of the past research into the composition and toxicity of UCM hydrocarbons has been conducted by the Petroleum and Environmental Geochemistry Group (PEGG) at the University of Plymouth, UK. As well as the hydrocarbon UCM, oils also contain more polar compounds such as those containing oxygen, sulphur or nitrogen. These compounds can be very soluble in water and hence bioavailable to marine and aquatic organisms. Polar UCMs are present within produced waters from oil rigs and from oil sands processing. A polar UCM fraction extracted from North Sea oil produced water was reported to elicit hormonal disruption by way of both estrogen receptor agonist and androgen receptor agonist activity. Ongoing concern regarding the potential toxicity of components within Athabasca Oil Sands (Canada) tailings ponds has highlighted the need for identification of the compounds present. Until recently, such positive identification of individual so-called naphthenic acids from oil sands produced waters had so far eluded characterisation but recent research by PEGG presented at a SETAC conference in 2010 revealed that, using a new GCxGC-TOF-MS, it was possible to resolve and identify a range of new compounds within such highly complex extracts. One group of compounds found to be present were tricyclic diamondoid acids. These structures had previously not even been considered as naphthenic acids and suggests an unprecedented degree of biodegradation of some of the oil in the oil sands.

== See also ==
- Gas-liquid chromatography
- Ecotoxicology
- Environmental chemistry
- Toxicology
- Pollution
- Endocrine disruptor
