= Electron capture detector =

Device for detecting atoms and molecules in a gas

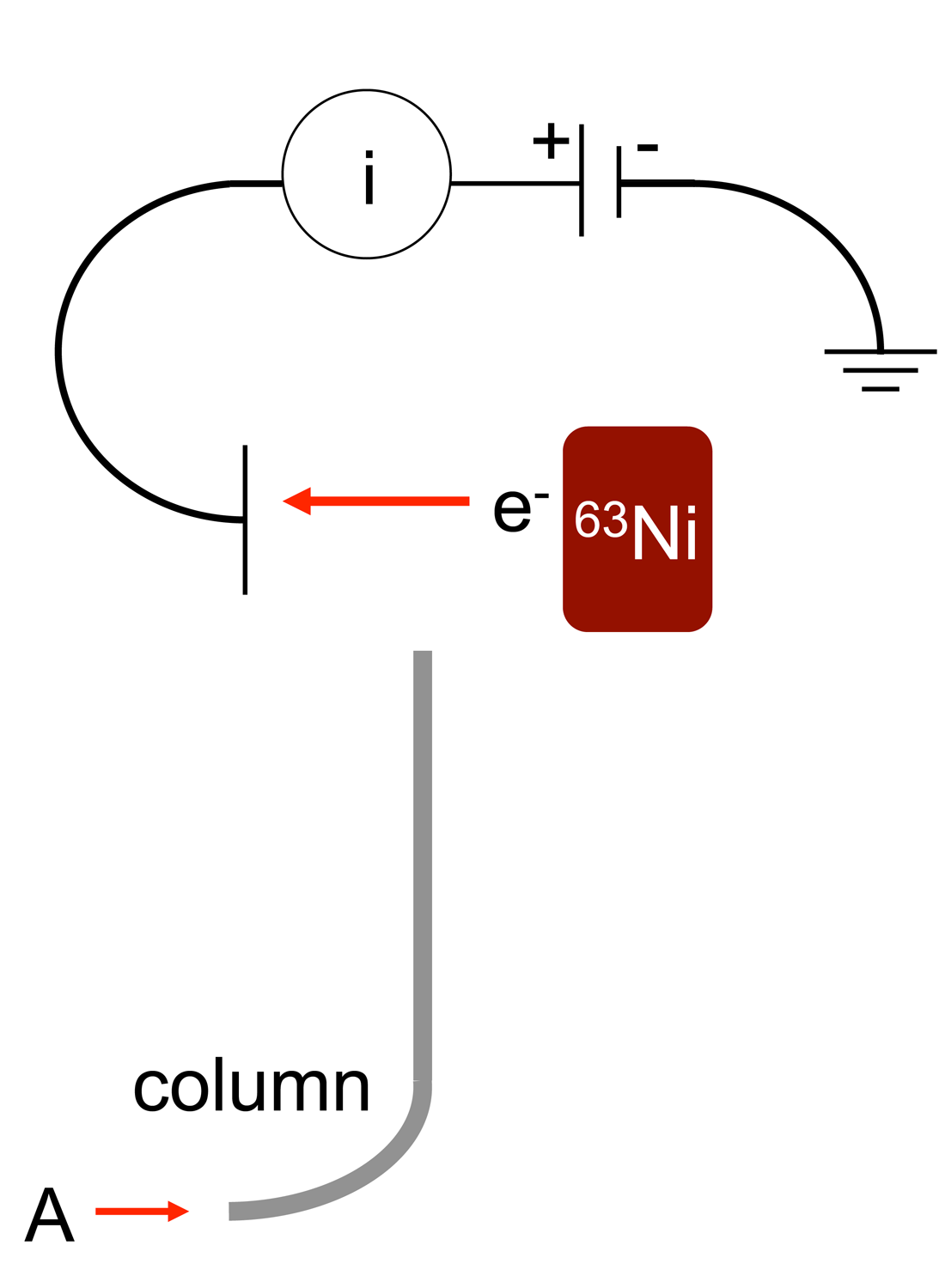
Schematic of an electron capture detector for a gas chromatograph with a ^{63}Ni source.

An electron capture detector (ECD) is a device for detecting atoms and molecules in a gas through the attachment of electrons via electron capture ionization. The device was invented in 1957 by James Lovelock and is used in gas chromatography to detect trace amounts of chemical compounds in a sample.

== Gas chromatograph detector ==
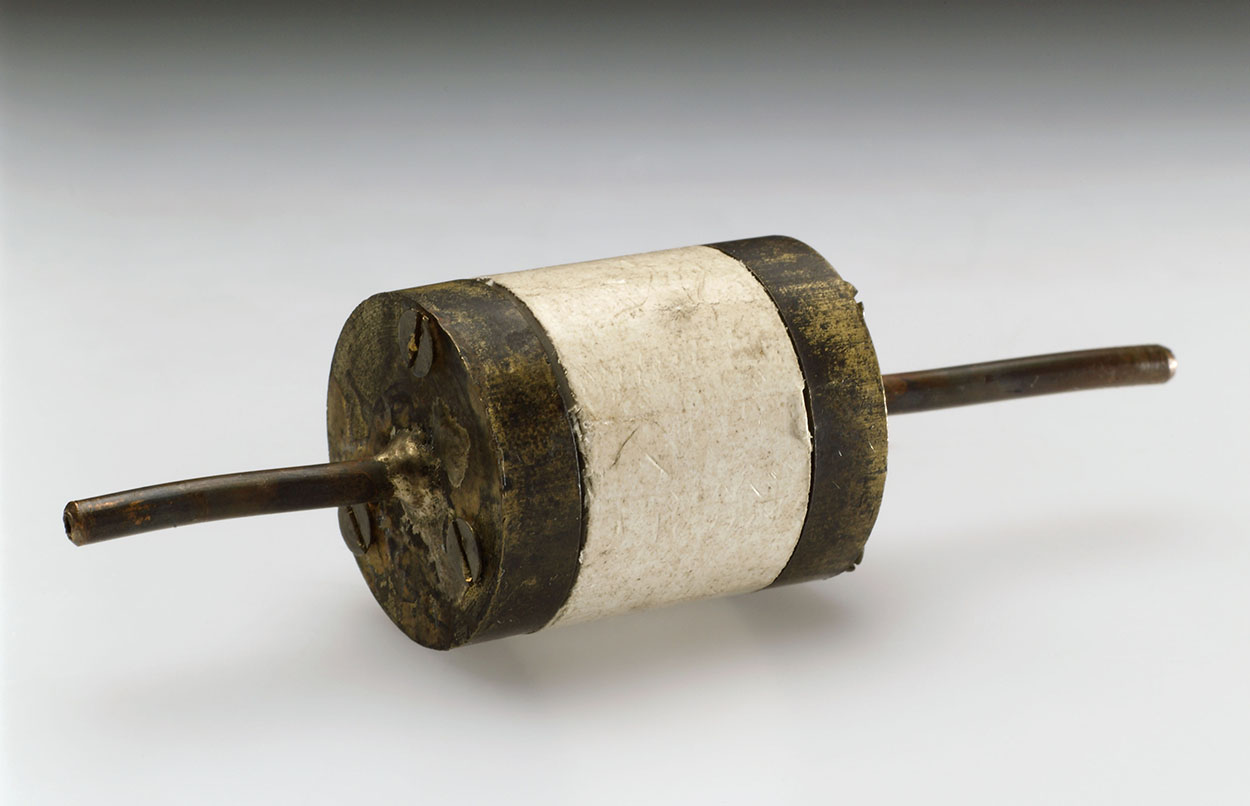
Electron capture detector developed by James Lovelock in the Science Museum, London

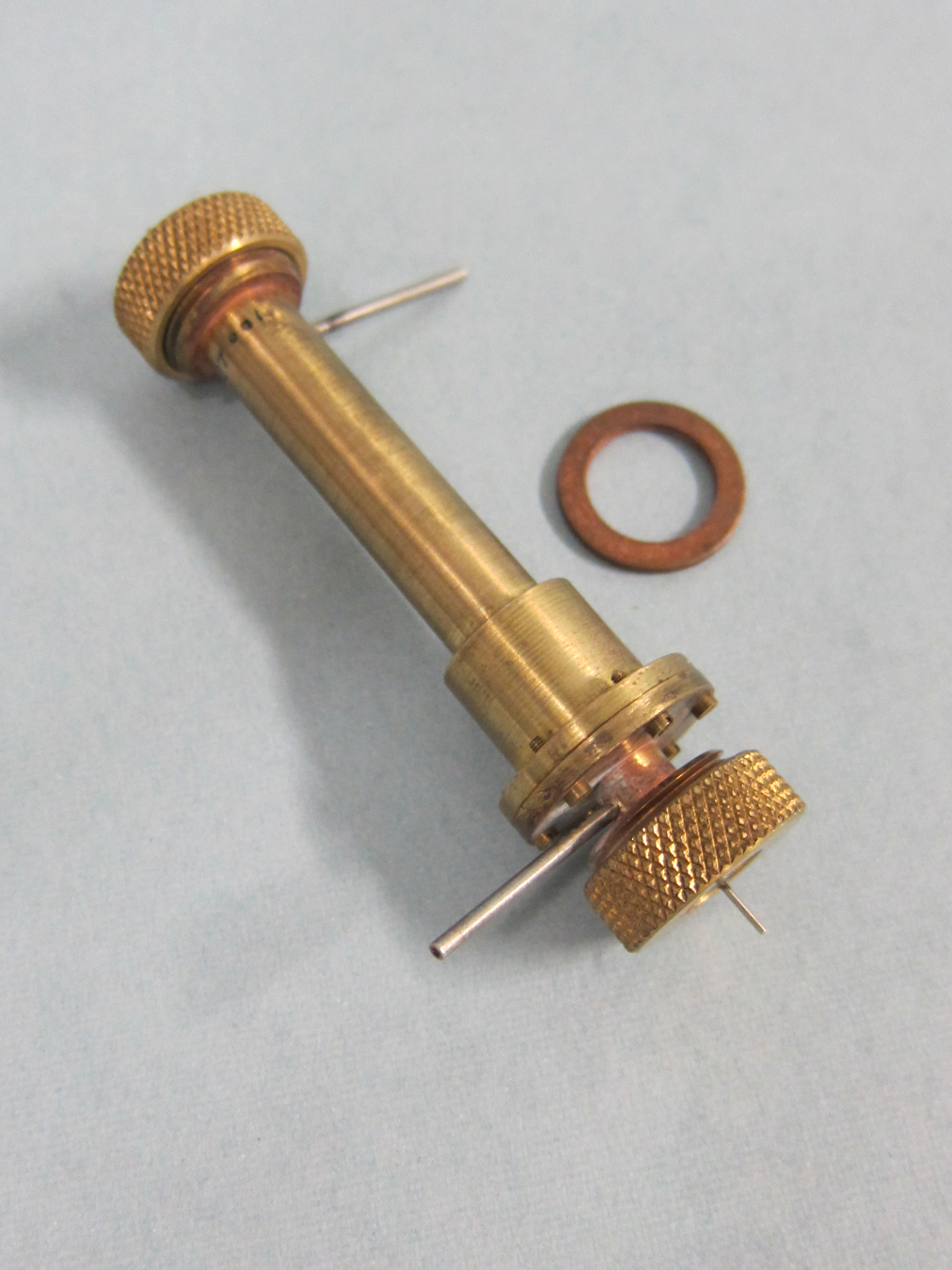
Electron capture detector, Science History Institute

The electron capture detector is used for detecting electron-absorbing components (high electronegativity) such as halogenated compounds in the output stream of a gas chromatograph. The ECD uses a radioactive beta particle (electron) emitter in conjunction with a so-called makeup gas flowing through the detector chamber. The electron emitter typically consists of a metal foil holding 10 millicuries (370 MBq) of the radionuclide ^{63}Ni. Usually, nitrogen is used as makeup gas, because it exhibits a low excitation energy, so it is easy to remove an electron from a nitrogen molecule. The electrons emitted from the electron emitter collide with the molecules of the makeup gas, resulting in many more free electrons. The electrons are accelerated towards a positively charged anode, generating a current. There is therefore always a background signal present in the chromatogram. As the sample is carried into the detector by the carrier gas, electron-absorbing analyte molecules capture electrons and thereby reduce the current between the collector anode and a cathode. Over a wide range of concentrations the rate of electron capture is proportional to the analyte concentration. ECD detectors are particularly sensitive to halogens, organometallic compounds, nitriles, or nitro compounds.

== Response mechanism ==
It is not immediately obvious why the capture of electrons by electronegative analytes reduces the current that flows between the anode and cathode: the molecular negative ions of the analyte carry the same charge as the electrons that were captured. The key to understanding why the current decreases is to ask where charged entities can go besides being collected at the anode and cathode. The answer is recombination of negative ions or electrons with the positive ions of the makeup gas before these charged entities can be collected at anode and cathode respectively. Negative and positive ions recombine much more rapidly than electrons and positive ions; it is this more rapid neutralization that is the origin of the observed decrease in current. Examination of the rate balance equation with all charge production and loss mechanisms considered reveals that the current collected when the electron capture detector is saturated with analyte is not zero: it is half the current collected when no analyte is present. To laboratory chromatographers this theoretical result is a well known experimental observation.

== Sensitivity ==
Depending on the analyte, an ECD can be 10-1000 times more sensitive than a flame ionization detector (FID), and one million times more sensitive than a thermal conductivity detector (TCD). An ECD has a limited dynamic range and finds its greatest application in analysis of halogenated compounds. The detection limit for electron capture detectors is 5 femtograms per second (fg/s) and the detector commonly exhibits a 10,000-fold linear range. This made it possible to detect halogenated compounds such as pesticides and CFCs, even at levels of only one part per trillion (ppt), thus revolutionizing our understanding of the atmosphere and pollutants.
