= Armbrust (surname) =

Armbrust is a surname. Notable people with the surname include:

- Barbara Armbrust (born 1963), Canadian rower
- E. Virginia Armbrust Biological oceanographer
- Heather Armbrust (born 1977), American professional bodybuilder
- Orville Armbrust (1908–1967), Major League Baseball pitcher
- Tobin Armbrust, American film producer

Fictional characters:

- Armbrust, a character of the anime series Kiddy Grade
- Crow Armbrust, character from hit video game series Trails.

Places

- Armbrust, Pennsylvania

Other

- Armbrust cup, an emergency hydration device
