= Gas chromatography-olfactometry =

Use of odour to purify volatile compounds

Gas chromatography-olfactometry (GC-O) is a technique that integrates the separation of volatile compounds using a gas chromatograph with the detection of odour using an olfactometer (human assessor). It was first invented and applied in 1964 by Fuller and co-workers. While GC separates volatile compounds from an extract, human olfaction detects the odour activity of each eluting compound. In this olfactometric detection, a human assessor may qualitatively determine whether a compound has odour activity or describe the odour perceived, or quantitatively evaluate the intensity of the odour or the duration of the odour activity. The olfactometric detection of compounds allows the assessment of the relationship between a quantified substance and the human perception of its odour, without instrumental detection limits present in other kinds of detectors. Compound identification still requires use of other detectors, such as mass spectrometry, with analytical standards.

== Olfactory perception ==
The properties of a compound relating to human olfactory perception includes its odour quality, threshold and intensity as a function of its concentration.

The odour quality of a (odour-active) compound is assessed using odour descriptors in sensory descriptive analyses. It shows the sensory–chemical relationship in volatile compounds. The odour quality of a compound may change with its concentration.

The absolute threshold of a compound is the minimum concentration at which it can be detected. In a mixture of volatile compounds, only the proportion of compounds present at concentrations above their threshold contribute to the odour. This property can be represented by the odour threshold (OT), the minimum concentration at which the odour is perceived by 50% of a human panel without determining its quality, or the recognition threshold, the minimum concentration at which the odour is perceived and can be described by 50% of a human panel.

The intensity of perception of a compound is positively correlated with its concentration. It is represented by the unique psychometric or concentration-response function of the compound. A psychometric function with a log concentration–perceived intensity plot is characterised by its sigmoidal shape, with its initial baseline representing the compound at concentrations below its threshold, a slow rise in response around the inflection point representing the threshold, an exponential rise in response as the concentration exceeds the threshold, a deceleration of the response to a flat region as the zone of saturation or the point at which the change in intensity is no longer perceived is reached. On the other hand, a log concentration–log perceived intensity plot, using Steven's power law, forms a linear line with the exponent characterising the relationship between the two variables.

== Experimental design ==
The apparatus consists of a gas chromatograph equipped with an odour port (ODP), in place of or in addition to conventional detectors, from with human assessors sniff the eluates. The odour port is characterised by its nose-cone design connected to the GC instrument by a transfer line. The odour port is commonly glass or polytetrafluoroethylene. It is generally placed 30–60 cm away from the instrument, extending from the side such that it is not affected by the hot GC oven. The deactivated silica transfer line is generally heated to prevent the condensation of less-volatile compounds. It is flexible so that the assessor can adjust it according to their comfortable sitting position. As traditional warm and dry carrier gases may dehydrate the mucous membrane of the nose, volatiles are delivered via auxiliary gas or humidified carrier gas, with relative humidity (RH) of 50–75%, to ease the dehydration.

The olfactometric detector may be coupled with, or connected in parallel to, a flame ionization detector (FID) or mass spectrometer (MS). Moreover, multiple odour ports may be set-up. In these cases, the eluate is generally split evenly between the detectors to allow it to reach the detectors simultaneously.

== Methods of detection ==
In a GC-O analysis, various methods are used to determine the odour contribution of a compound or the relative importance of each odorant. The methods can be categorised as (i) detection frequency, (ii) dilution to threshold and (iii) direct intensity.

=== Detection frequency ===
The GC-O analysis is carried out by a panel of 6–12 assessors to count the number of participants who perceive an odour at each retention time. This frequency is then used to represent the relative importance of an odorant in the extract. It is also presumed to relate to the intensity of the odorant at the particular concentration, based on the assumption that individual detection thresholds are normally distributed.

Two different kinds of data can be reported by this method depending on the data collected. First, if only frequency data is available, it is reported as the nasal impact frequency (NIF) or the peak height of the olfactometric signal. It is zero if no assessor senses the odour and added with one each time an assessor senses an odour. Second, if both frequency of detection and duration of odour are collected, the surface of NIF (SNIF) or the peak area corresponding to the product of frequency of detection (%) and duration of odour (s) can be interpreted. SNIF allows further interpretation of odour compounds other than just peak height.

The detection frequency method benefits from its simplicity and lack of requirement for trained assessors, as the signal recorded is binary (presence/absence of odour). On the other hand, a drawback of this method is the limitation to the assumption of the relationship between frequency and perceived odour intensity. Odour-active compounds in food samples are often present at concentrations above their detection thresholds. This means that a compound may be detected by all assessors and therefore reach the limit of 100% detection in spite of increases in intensity.

=== Dilution to threshold ===
A dilution series of a sample or extract is prepared and assessed for presence of odour. The result can be described as the odour potency of a compound.

One kind of analysis is to measure the maximum dilution in the series in which odour is still perceived. The resulting value is called the flavour dilution (FD) factor in the aroma extraction dilution analysis (AEDA) developed in 1987 by Schieberle and Grosch. On the other hand, another kind of analysis is to also measure the duration of the perceived odour to compute peak areas. The peak areas are known as Charm values in the CharmAnalysis developed in 1984 by Acree and co-workers. The former can then be interpreted as the peak height of the latter. Because the odour threshold of a compound is intended to be measured from a prepared series of dilution (commonly by a factor of 2–3 with 8–10 dilutions), the precision and variation in data can be determined from the dilution factors used.

Due to time demand requirements from this method and the general requirement for multiple assessors to minimise errors, having the column split into multiple odour ports would be beneficial for the method.

=== Direct intensity ===
This method adds to the dilution to threshold method by considering the perceived intensity of the compounds as well. Assessors can report this based on a predetermined scale.

The posterior intensity method measures the maximum intensity perceived for each eluting compound. A panel of assessors is recommended to be used to obtain an averaged signal. On the other hand, the dynamic time-intensity method measures the intensity at different points in time starting from the time of elution, allowing a continuous measurement of onset, maximum, and decline of the odour intensity. This is used in the Osme (Greek word for odour) method developed in 1992 by Da Silva. An aromagram can then be constructed in a similar way as an FID chromatogram whereby intensity is plotted as a function of retention time. The peak height corresponds to the maximum intensity perceived whereas the peak width corresponds to the duration of the odour perceived.

The time requirement maybe high for this particular method regarding the essentials of assessor training, as lack of training may result in inconsistencies in scale usage. However, with a trained panel of assessors, the analysis can be done in a relatively short amount of time with high precision.

== Variations ==
- Gas chromatography/mass spectrometry-olfactometry (GC/MS-O)
- GC-recomposition-olfactometry (GC-R)
- Multi-gas chromatography-olfactometry
