= DID =

DID, DiD or did may refer to:

== Arts and entertainment ==
- Dance India Dance, an Indian reality dance show from 2009
- Dog Is Dead, a five-piece indie pop band from Nottingham, England

== Businesses and organisations ==
- Digital Image Design, a British video game developer
- Développement International Desjardins, a subsidiary of Desjardins Group

== Medical ==
- Dissociative identity disorder, previously known as multiple personality disorder (MPD), a dissociative disorder characterized by the presence of at least two personality states or "alters"

== Science and technology ==
- Did, Bowers acronym for a dodecadodecahedron
- Data item descriptions, a specification used by United States Department of Defense contractors
- Decentralized identifier, a type of globally unique identifier
- Difference in differences, a statistical technique
- Direct inward dialing, in telephony
- Discharge ionization detector, a detector in gas chromatography

== Other uses ==
- Past tense of the English verb do, which may serve as an auxiliary verb; see Do-support
- Didcot Parkway railway station, England, station code DID
