= Christopher M. Reddy =

American environmental chemist (born 1969)

Christopher Michael Reddy
- Born: 1969 (age 56–57)
- Education: Rhode Island College, University of Rhode Island
- Awards: James T. Grady-James H. Stack Award for Interpreting Chemistry for the Public (2024), Gold Winner Nonfiction Book Award (2024), Charles B. Willard Professional Achievement Award (2023), ACS Environmental Au Best Paper Award 2021–2022 (2022), AGU Ambassador Award (2018), AGU Geochemical Fellow (2018), Appointment to WHOI Stanley W. Watson Chair for Excellence in Oceanography (2016), C. C. Patterson Award (2014), GS/ EAG Geochemistry Fellow (2014), ACS R. A. Glenn Award (2013), URI Dean's Award (2011), Marine Pollution Bulletin Best Paper (2011), Kavli Fellow (2009, 2010, 2011), John B. Philips Award (2007), Aldo Leopold Leadership Fellow (2006), Naval Research Young Investigator Award (2002)
- Scientific career
- Fields: marine pollution, marine natural products, petroleum geochemistry, and science communication
- Workplaces: Woods Hole Oceanographic Institution, MIT-WHOI Joint Program in Oceanography/Applied Ocean Science and Engineering
- Thesis: Studies on the fates of organic contaminants in aquatic environments (1997)
- Website: https://christopherreddy.com

Christopher Michael Reddy (born 1969) is a senior scientist in the Department of Marine Chemistry & Geochemistry of the Woods Hole Oceanographic Institution (WHOI) and faculty member of the MIT-WHOI Joint Program in Oceanography/Applied Ocean Science and Engineering.

Reddy's research includes the source, fate, and transport of combustion-derived materials, PCBs, and DDT; the environmental chemistry of oil spills, biofuels, plastics, and nanoparticles; and the development of environmentally friendly products. He is considered a leading scientist on oil spills and conducted an in-depth and long-term investigation into the Deepwater Horizon oil spill and its long-term aftereffects.

Reddy holds eleven U.S. patents. He has testified before the U.S. Congress five times, written more than 20 opinion pieces, and given hundreds of interviews for print, radio, and television. Reddy gave a TEDx talk on the role of science in a crisis. A newly discovered microbe that can aid in the breakdown of hydrocarbons was named in his honor.

== Early life and education ==
Reddy grew up on Rhode Island’s Narragansett Bay and has always lived within a few miles of the coast. After attending public schools in Rhode Island, Reddy earned a BS in chemistry with a minor in mathematics from Rhode Island College, graduating in 1992. While there, he was named the American Chemical Society's Outstanding Undergraduate Student in 1991. In 1997, he was awarded a PhD in chemical oceanography from the Graduate School of Oceanography at the University of Rhode Island. While a graduate student, he was named the American Chemical Society's Outstanding Graduate Student in Environmental Chemistry.

== Career highlights ==
After receiving his BS in 1992, Reddy worked as a chemist for ULTRA Scientific in North Kingstown, RI, and then as an environmental chemist for CEIMIC Corporation located in Narragansett, RI, from 1993 through 1994. While earning his PhD at URI, he worked as a research graduate assistant in chemical oceanography.

Reddy began his employment with Woods Hole Oceanographic Institution's Department of Marine Chemistry and Geochemistry in 1997 after earning his PhD and has remained there since, as a post-doctoral scholar and investigator (1997–2000), assistant scientist (2000–2004), associate scientist (2004–2006), associate scientist with tenure (2006–2010), and senior scientist (2010–present). Also at WHOI, he was manager of the WHOI Small Boats Fleet from 2008–2014 and director of the Coastal Ocean Institute from 2008–2015.

During his time with WHOI, Reddy has also been a visiting scholar at Scripps Institution of Oceanography at UC San Diego, La Jolla, CA, in 2003 and a visiting associate at the California Institute of Technology's Division of Geologic and Planetary Sciences located in Pasadena, CA, in 2005.

== Awards and honors ==
- 2024 - The American Chemical Society's James T. Grady-James H. Stack Award for Interpreting Chemistry for the Public.
- 2024 - Gold Winner Nonfiction Book Award by the Nonfiction Authors Association for Reddy's book Science Communication in a Crisis: An Insider's Guide.
- 2023 - The Rhode Island College Charles B. Willard Professional Achievement Award to a graduate who has brought honor to the college by distinguished achievement in their field.
- 2023 - The naming of a newly discovered marine microbe capable of degrading branched alkanes (acyclic saturated hydrocarbons) Candidatus Reddybacter in Reddy's honor.
- 2022 - The ACS Environmental Au Best Paper Award 2021–2022 for a paper on the environmental effects of the spill of more than 70 billion nurdles (plastic pellets) off the coast of Sri Lanka when the cargo ship M/V X-Press Pearl caught fire there in May 2021.
- 2018 - The American Geophysical Union's Ambassador Award because Reddy "embodies the concept of a scientific ambassador through his tireless efforts to represent, promote, and translate science to a diverse range of groups outside the ivory tower."
- 2016 - Appointment to WHOI's Stanley W. Watson Chair for Excellence in Oceanography.
- 2014 - The Geochemical Society's prestigious Clair C. Patterson Award for Reddy's work on the effects of oil spills on the ocean. Named for geochemist Clair Cameron Patterson, this annual award recognizes the contributions of a scientist who has made "an innovative breakthrough in environmental geochemistry of fundamental significance within the last decade, particularly in service to society."
- 2013 - The R. A. Glenn Award for the most innovative and interesting technical paper
- 2011 - The University of Rhode Island Dean's Award to honor alumni who "personify URI’s tradition of excellence in achievement, leadership, and service."
- 2007 - The John B. Philips Award (International GCxGC Symposium) to the inventor of an application of comprehensive two-dimensional gas chromatography (GC×GC) viewed to have the most potential impact on the technique's future.
- 2003 - Office of Naval Research (ONR) Young Investigator Program Award for research in use of comprehensive two-dimensional gas chromatography to enhance assessment and management of hydrocarbons in the ocean.

== Fellowships ==
- 2018 - Geochemical Fellow, American Geophysical Union (AGU).
- 2014 - Geochemistry Fellow, the Geochemical Society and European Association of Geochemistry, which confer this highly prestigious, honorary title on "outstanding scientists who have, over some years, made a major contribution to the field of geochemistry."
- 2009, 2010, 2011 - Kavli Fellow, the U.S. National Academy of Sciences premiere recognition of distinguished young scientists, i.e., those 45 years of age or under.
- 2006 - Leadership Fellow, the Aldo Leopold Foundation (now the Earth Leadership Program).

== Patents ==
- Reddy, Christopher Michael, Mullins, Oliver C., Raghuraman, Bhavani, and Nelson, Robert K. High accuracy contamination estimation in hydrocarbon samples using GC×GC. U.S. Patent 7805979B2, filed October 22, 2007, and issued October 5, 2010.
- Reddy, Christopher M. Biofuel manufacturing methods and systems incorporating radiocarbon analysis techniques. U.S. Patent 20100273210A1, filed April 7, 2010, and issued September 17, 2013.
- Plata, Desiree L., Gschwend, Philip M., Hart, Anastasios John, Meshot, Eric R., and Reddy, Christopher M. Alkyne-assisted nanostructure growth. U.S. Patent 9394174B2, filed August 26, 2013, and issued July 19, 2016.
- Gupta, Ananya Sen, Reddy, Christopher, M., and Nelson, Robert. Systems and methods for topographic analysis. U.S. Patent 8838393B2, filed April 2, 2012, and issued September 16, 2014.
- Plata, Desiree L., Gschwend, Philip M., Hart, Anastasios John, Meshot, Eric R., and Reddy, Christopher M. Alkyne-assisted nanostructure growth. U.S. Patent 9394174B2, filed August 26, 2013, and issued July 19, 2016.
- Lindell, Scott R., Reddy, Christopher M., and O'Neil, Gregory W. Use of marine algae for producing polymers. U.S. Patent 9879288B2, filed November 17, 2011, and issued January 30, 2018.
- Reddy, Christopher M., O'Neil, Gregory W., and Lindell, Scott R. Use of marine algae for co-producing alkenones, alkenone derivatives, and co-products. U.S. Patent 9970034B2, filed January 17, 2015, and issued May 15, 2018.
- Reddy, Christopher M., O'Neil, Gregory W., and Lindell, Scott R. Use of marine algae for co-producing alkenones, alkenone derivatives, and co-products. U.S. Patent 20190161777A1, filed January 28, 2019, and issued September 14, 2021.
- O'Neil, Gregory W., and Reddy, Christopher M. Alkenone-based formulations for topical applications. U.S. Patent 20240122828A1, filed November 2, 2023, and pending.
- Reddy, Christopher M., O'Neil, Gregory W., and Lindell, Scott R. Use of marine algae for co-producing alkenones, alkenone derivatives, and co-products. U.S. Patent 11634738B2, filed July 29, 2021, and issued April 25, 2023.
- O'Neil, Gregory W., and Reddy, Christopher M. Alkenone-based formulations for topical applications. U.S. Patent 20240122828A1, filed November 2, 2023, and pending.

== Research areas ==
=== Oil spills ===
Reddy is best known for his and his team’s research into “the processes that regulate the fate of petroleum following release to the environment” and for the invention of the application of comprehensive two-dimensional gas chromatography (GCxGC) that enables identification of these processes which Reddy patented.

As it degrades in a marine environment, oil undergoes complex transformations, producing residues composed of extremely complex organic mixtures that accumulate in protective environments such as those afforded by fiddler crabs and marsh grass. These residues form the majority of the unresolved complex mixture (UCM) resulting from the breakdown of crude oils which GC had previously been unable to resolve but which Reddy’s novel GCxGC application has made accessible, enabling determination of “the underlying processes controlling petroleum fate” as it degrades in a marine environment. For this invention, Reddy was awarded the Clair C. Patterson Award in 2014 by the Geochemical Society for "an innovative breakthrough in environmental geochemistry of fundamental significance within the last decade, particularly in service to society. To be viewed as innovative, the work must show a high degree of creativity and/or be a fundamental departure from usual practice while contributing significantly to understanding in environmental geochemistry."

Reddy's investigation into an oil spill that had occurred along West Falmouth Harbor, Massachusetts, in 1969 revealed chemical and biological effects that had persisted even after 30 years in fiddler crabs and salt marsh grass. The results of this study, which lasted from 1999 to 2008, led to significant advances in oil spill remediation. Similarly, Reddy and the WHOI chemistry team conducted an extensive study of the Bouchard Oil Spill, which occurred in Massachusetts’ Buzzards Bay in 2003, using GCxGC.

Reddy and his team were some of the first chemists involved in the 2010 Deepwater Horizon disaster in the Gulf of Mexico and spent the following ~10 years investigating the Deepwater Horizon oil spill and its aftermath. Reddy was thus involved in mapping the surface plumes, characterizing the oil and gas emitted from the seafloor, estimating the flow rate of oil streaming from the damaged well, modeling the fate of oil and gases in the ocean and atmosphere, monitoring the breakdown of the oil, and gauging the efficacy of dispersants.

Reddy and his team members were unfortunately drawn into the ensuing legal aspects of the spill when the U.S. Government used the data he and his team had collected to determine how much BP owed by way of restitution. BP challenged the amount of this restitution and requested Reddy's and his team members' emails and personal correspondence for the time period over which they had studied the spill, a request with which they were reluctantly forced to comply in 2011 following litigation. The Deepwater Horizon spill also led to one of Reddy's appearances before the U.S. Congress, testifying on 15 June 2010 regarding government agencies' preparedness to respond to crises such as Deepwater Horizon.

Reddy is currently working with UC Santa Barbara researchers to investigate natural oil seepage from the ocean floor off the coast of California.

To honor Reddy’s contributions to the study of oil spills, a newly discovered marine microbe capable of degrading branched alkanes was named Candidatus Reddybacter in his honor.

=== Other research ===
In addition to oil spills, Reddy is engaged in research related to degradation of other chemicals and plastics that have been dumped or spilled in the ocean (e.g., the 2021 nurdle spill off the coast of Sri Lanka), development of biofuels, replacement of hydrocarbons from fossil fuels in personal care products with chemicals derived from marine algae, and design of safer and more sustainable plastics.

=== Science communication ===
Reddy reportedly views communication of scientific matters to diverse audiences and "building connections between the scientific community and societal stakeholders" to be important parts of being a scientist and has sought to develop and communicate this skill to peers and students. He received the 2023 James T. Grady-James H. Stack Award for Interpreting Chemistry for the Public and the 2018 GSU Ambassador Award

Reddy's efforts extend to influencing the next generation of scientists, and he collaborates on a science communication graduate course taught at WHOI titled "How Not to Write for Peer-Reviewed Journals: Talking to Everyone Else."

Effective communication of scientific information to nonscientists is even more important during a crisis such as the Deepwater Horizon oil spill, Reddy believes, and has been the subject of talks (e.g., his TEDx talk using clips from the original Star Trek television series) and his book, Science Communication in a Crisis: An Insider's Guide. The latter, which is intended "to help scientists understand how best to communicate their knowledge and expertise in the event of an environmental crisis," draws on Reddy's years of responding to environmental crises and communicating actionable information to peers, journalists, regulators, and the public. John E. Riutta, author of The Well-Read Naturalist, describes the book as "a collection of analyses and recommendations for those ... faced with presenting important scientific information to audiences both large and small during times of profound uncertainty" and terms it "very timely" given "the many destructive environmental and medical crises" that have occurred over recent decades.

== Publications ==
Reddy published around 500 pieces in academic journals.

Reddy wrote two books: Science Communication in a Crisis: An Insider's Guide and one of the A Kids Book About children's series titled A Kids Book About Being a Scientist.
