= Benjamin Van Mooy =

American oceanographer

- Born: 1971 or 1972
- Awards: MacArthur Fellowship

Academic background
- Education: Northwestern University (B.A.); University of Washington (M.S.), (PhD)

Benjamin Van Mooy (born 1971 or 1972) is an oceanographer and senior scientist at the Woods Hole Oceanographic Institution located in Woods Hole, MA. His work primarily focuses on chemical oceanography, with a particular focus on the production and remineralization of marine organic matter.

Van Mooy received a BA from Northwestern University in 1995 and an MS (2000) and PhD (2003) from the University of Washington. He joined the Woods Hole Oceanographic Institution in 2003 and is currently a senior scientist and Deputy Director & VP for Science & Engineering.

He is credited with the discovery of sulfolipid substitution for phospholipids in marine plankton in times of phosphorus scarcity, and the production of viral glycosphingolipids as a result of infection from coccolithoviruses in Emiliania huxleyii

In 2024, Van Mooy was awarded a MacArthur Fellowship.

== Most cited publications ==
- Reddy CM, Arey JS, Seewald JS, Sylva SP, Lemkau KL, Nelson RK, Carmichael CA, McIntyre CP, Fenwick J, Ventura GT, Van Mooy BA. Composition and fate of gas and oil released to the water column during the Deepwater Horizon oil spill. Proceedings of the National Academy of Sciences. 2012 Dec 11;109(50):20229-34. According to Google Scholar, it has been cited 629 times.
- Camilli R, Reddy CM, Yoerger DR, Van Mooy BA, Jakuba MV, Kinsey JC, McIntyre CP, Sylva SP, Maloney JV. Tracking hydrocarbon plume transport and biodegradation at Deepwater Horizon. Science. 2010 Oct 8;330(6001):201-4. According to Google Scholar, this article has been cited 830 times
- Van Mooy BA, Fredricks HF, Pedler BE, Dyhrman ST, Karl DM, Koblížek M, Lomas MW, Mincer TJ, Moore LR, Moutin T, Rappé MS. Phytoplankton in the ocean use non-phosphorus lipids in response to phosphorus scarcity. Nature. 2009 Mar;458(7234):69-72. According to Google Scholar, this article has been cited 610 times
- Buesseler KO, Lamborg CH, Boyd PW, Lam PJ, Trull TW, Bidigare RR, Bishop JK, Casciotti KL, Dehairs F, Elskens M, Honda M. Revisiting carbon flux through the ocean's twilight zone. science. 2007 Apr 27;316(5824):567-70. According to Google Scholar, this article has been cited 577 times
- Van Mooy BA, Rocap G, Fredricks HF, Evans CT, Devol AH. Sulfolipids dramatically decrease phosphorus demand by picocyanobacteria in oligotrophic marine environments. Proceedings of the National Academy of Sciences. 2006 Jun 6;103(23):8607-12. According to Google Scholar, this article has been cited 323 times
