= Sonya Dyhrman =

Phytoplankton ecologist

Sonya T. Dyhrman
- Born: 1972 (age 53–54)
- Education: Scripps Institution of Oceanography
- Scientific career
- Workplaces: Woods Hole Oceanographic Institution; Columbia University, Lamont–Doherty Earth Observatory
- Thesis: Cellular markers of phosphate stress in phytoplankton (1999)

Sonya Dyhrman is an earth and environmental sciences professor who studies the physiology of phytoplankton and their role within marine ecosystems. She is also a fellow of the American Academy of Microbiology.

== Education and career ==
Dyrhman grew up in Washington where she spent days clamming on Puget Sound and started scuba diving before she could drive. She went to Dartmouth College and received her B.A. in 1994. She then earned her Ph.D. from Scripps Institution of Oceanography, University of California, San Diego in 1999. Following her Ph.D., she joined Woods Hole Oceanographic Institution as postdoc and transitioned onto the scientific staff in 2002. In 2014, she moved to Columbia University, Lamont–Doherty Earth Observatory (LDEO) where she is a professor in earth and environmental sciences.

== Research ==
Dyhrman uses molecular tools to examine phytoplankton in marine systems, with a focus on their ecosystem structure and biogeochemical impact. Her Ph.D. research examined the role of phosphate stress on phytoplankton where she identified proteins found in dinoflagellates grown under phosphate-limited conditions and then applied this tool to assess phosphate-stress conditions in the field. She has examined variability in how phytoplankton consume and produce different forms of phosphorus including dissolved organic phosphorus, polyphosphate, and phosphonates. Dyhrman has also looked at cell-specific phosphorus stress using Trichodesmium as a model cyanobacteria, and specifically examined how use Trichodesmium use phosphonate in the ocean. A portion of her research interests include investigations into diatoms, cyanobacteria, and harmful algal organisms.

== Selected publications ==
- Dyhrman, Sonya T.; Ruttenberg, Kathleen C. (2006). "Presence and regulation of alkaline phosphatase activity in eukaryotic phytoplankton from the coastal ocean: Implications for dissolved organic phosphorus remineralization". Limnology and Oceanography. 51 (3): 1381–1390. Bibcode:2006LimOc..51.1381D. doi:10.4319/lo.2006.51.3.1381. ISSN 1939-5590.
- Dyhrman, S. T.; Chappell, P. D.; Haley, S. T.; Moffett, J. W.; Orchard, E. D.; Waterbury, J. B.; Webb, E. A. (January 2006). "Phosphonate utilization by the globally important marine diazotroph Trichodesmium". Nature. 439 (7072): 68–71. Bibcode:2006Natur.439...68D. doi:10.1038/nature04203. ISSN 1476-4687. PMID 16397497. S2CID 4409898.
- Dyhrman, Sonya T.; Ammerman, James W.; Van Mooy, Benjamin A. S. (2007). "Microbes and the Marine Phosphorus Cycle". Oceanography. 20 (2): 110–116. Bibcode:2007Ocgpy..20b.110D. doi:10.5670/oceanog.2007.54. hdl:1912/2777. ISSN 1042-8275. JSTOR 24860049.
- Van Mooy, Benjamin A. S.; Fredricks, Helen F.; Pedler, Byron E.; Dyhrman, Sonya T.; Karl, David M.; Koblížek, Michal; Lomas, Michael W.; Mincer, Tracy J.; Moore, Lisa R.; Moutin, Thierry; Rappé, Michael S.; Webb, Eric A. (March 2009). "Phytoplankton in the ocean use non-phosphorus lipids in response to phosphorus scarcity". Nature. 458 (7234): 69–72. Bibcode:2009Natur.458...69V. doi:10.1038/nature07659. ISSN 1476-4687. PMID 19182781. S2CID 18437046.
- Dyhrman, Sonya T.; Jenkins, Bethany D.; Rynearson, Tatiana A.; Saito, Mak A.; Mercier, Melissa L.; Alexander, Harriet; Whitney, LeAnn P.; Drzewianowski, Andrea; Bulygin, Vladimir V.; Bertrand, Erin M.; Wu, Zhijin; Benitez-Nelson, Claudia; Heithoff, Abigail (29 March 2012). "The Transcriptome and Proteome of the Diatom Thalassiosira pseudonana Reveal a Diverse Phosphorus Stress Response". PLOS ONE. 7 (3) e33768. Bibcode:2012PLoSO...733768D. doi:10.1371/journal.pone.0033768. ISSN 1932-6203. PMC 3315573. PMID 22479440.

== Awards and honors ==
- Marie Tharp Fellow, Columbia University Earth Institute (2007)
- Sir Allan Sewell Fellow, Griffith University
- Kavli Fellow, National Academy Frontiers of Science 2014, 2016)
- Fellow, American Academy of Microbiology (2019)
