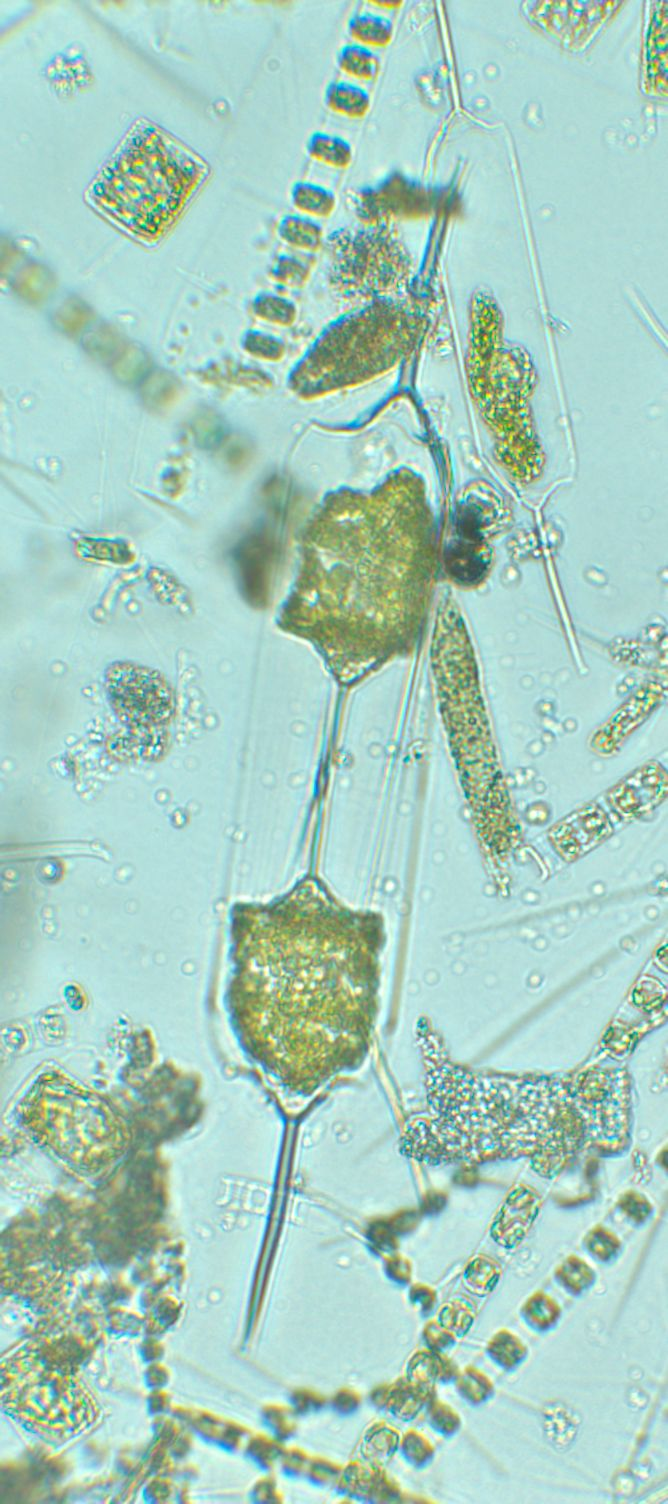
- Ditylum brightwellii

Scientific classification
- Domain: Eukaryota
- Clade: Diaphoretickes
- Clade: SAR
- Clade: Stramenopiles
- Phylum: Gyrista
- Subphylum: Ochrophytina
- Class: Bacillariophyceae
- Order: Lithodesmiales
- Family: Lithodesmiaceae
- Genus: Ditylum; J.W.Bailey ex L.W.Bailey, 1861

= Ditylum =

Genus of algae

Ditylum is a genus of diatoms belonging to the family Lithodesmiaceae.

The genus has cosmopolitan distribution.

Species:

- Ditylum brightwellii (T.West) Grunow, 1885
- Ditylum buchananii von Stosch, 1987
- Ditylum cornutum Forti & Schulz, 1932
- Ditylum ehrenbergii Grunow, 1883
- Ditylum grovei Brun, 1891
- Ditylum inaequale J.W.Bailey ex L.W.Bailey, 1862
- Ditylum pernodi Schröder, 1906
- Ditylum segmentale Brun, 1891
- Ditylum sol (Grunow) De Toni, 1894
- Ditylum trigonum L.W.Bailey ex L.W.Bailey, 1862
- Ditylum trigonum Schröder, 1906
