= Pulsed discharge ionization detector =

A pulsed discharge ionization detector (pulsed discharge detector) is a detector for gas chromatography that utilizes a stable, low powered, pulsed DC discharge in helium as an ionization source.

Eluants from the GC column, flowing counter to the flow of helium from the discharge zone, are ionized by photons from the helium discharge. Bias electrode(s) focus the resulting electrons toward the collector electrode, where they cause changes in the standing current which are quantified as the detector output.

== Electron capture mode ==
In the electron capture mode, the PDD is a selective detector for monitoring high electron affinity compounds such as freons, chlorinated pesticides, and other halogen compounds. For this type of compound, the minimum detectable quantity (MDQ) is at the femtogram ($10^{-15}\,\mathrm{g}$) or picogram ($10^{-12}\,\mathrm{g}$) level. The PDD is similar in sensitivity and response characteristics to a conventional radioactive ECD, and can be operated at temperatures up to 400°C. For operation in this mode, $\ce{He}$ and $\ce{CH4}$ are introduced just upstream from the column exit.

== Helium photoionization mode ==
In the helium photoionization mode, the PDD is a universal, non-destructive, high sensitivity detector. The response to both inorganic and organic compounds is linear over a wide range. Response to fixed gases is positive (increase in standing current), with an MDQ in the low ppb range. The PDD in helium photoionization mode is an excellent replacement for flame ionization detectors in petrochemical or refinery environments, where the flame and use of hydrogen can be problematic. In addition, when the helium discharge gas is doped with a suitable noble gas, such as argon, krypton, or xenon (depending on the desired cutoff point), the PDD can function as a specific photoionization detector for selective determination of aliphatics, aromatics, amines, as well as other species.
