= Helium ionization detector =

A helium ionization detector (HID) is a type of detector used in gas chromatography.

== Principle ==
An HID connected to a gas chromatograph (GC) has the great advantage to use helium as both the carrier gas and the ionization gas. An HID is an ion detector which uses a radioactive source, typically β-emitters, to create metastable helium species. The radioactive source ionizes helium atoms by bombarding them with emissions. The metastable helium species have an energy of up to 19.8 eV. These metastable helium species can ionize all compounds with the exception of neon which has a greater ionization potential of 21.56 eV. As components elute from the GC's column they collide with the metastable helium ions, which then ionize the components. The ions produce an electric current, which is the signal output of the detector. The greater the concentration of the component, the more ions are produced, and the greater the current.

== Application ==
HIDs are sensitive to a broad range of components. They must use helium as a carrier gas.

HID is classified as a mass sensitive detector, which means that its signal is proportional to the mass of analyte entering the detector per unit time. The analytes are destroyed during reaction, therefore, it is considered a destructive detector.

The drawback to HIDs are that they contain a radioactive source. In the United States, this means they fall under a number of federal regulations concerning their use in the workplace, shipping, disposal, etc. Discharge ionization detectors have generally supplanted them.
