= Comprehensive two-dimensional gas chromatography =

Gas chromatography technique

Comprehensive two-dimensional gas chromatography, or GC×GC, is a multidimensional gas chromatography technique that was originally described in 1984 by J. Calvin Giddings and first successfully implemented in 1991 by John Phillips and his student Zaiyou Liu.

GC×GC utilizes two different columns with two different stationary phases. In GC×GC, all of the effluent from the first dimension column is diverted to the second dimension column via a modulator. The modulator quickly traps, then "injects" the effluent from the first dimension column onto the second dimension. This process creates a retention plane of the 1st dimension separation x 2nd dimension separation.

The oil and gas industry was an early adopter of the technology for the complex oil samples to determine the many different types of hydrocarbons and their isomers. In these types of samples, over 30000 different compounds could be identified in a crude oil with this comprehensive chromatography technology (CCT).

The CCT evolved from a technology only used in academic R&D laboratories into a more robust technology used in many different industrial labs. Comprehensive chromatography is used in forensics, food and flavor, environmental, metabolomics, biomarkers and clinical applications. Some of the most well-established research groups in the world that are found in Australia, Italy, the Netherlands, Canada, United States, and Brazil use this analytical technique.

== Modulation: The process ==
In GC × GC two columns are connected sequentially, typically the first dimension is a conventional column and the second dimension is a short fast GC type, with a modulator positioned between them. The function of the modulator can be divided into basically three processes:

1. continuously collect small fractions of the effluent from 1D, ensuring that the separation is maintained in this dimension;
2. focus or refocus the effluent of a narrow band;
3. to quickly transfer the 2D fraction collected and focused as a narrow pulse. Taken together, these three steps are called modulation cycle, which is repeated throughout the chromatographic run.

=== Thermal modulation ===
Thermal modulators use broad temperature differentials (by way of hot and cold jets) to trap and release analytes eluting out of the primary column. Commercial devices typically use two-stage modulation either via a quad jet approach (where there are two pairs of jets to trap and release the analytes on two different sections of the column) or a delay loop (where the column loops back between a single pair of jets). Both approaches ensure there are two opportunities to focus the analytes.

There are also different versions of thermal modulators based on what is used to cool the cold jet (a stream of dry gas, usually air or nitrogen). Liquid nitrogen cooled loop system provide the lowest temperature for thermal modulation, meaning it is capable of modulating volatiles from C2. However, there is the compromise that liquid nitrogen is expensive and causes additional health and safety concerns. Alternatively, consumable-free thermal modulators are available that use a closed cycle refrigeration unit to cool the cold jet.

=== Consumable-free thermal modulation ===
This approach eliminates the need for liquid nitrogen for thermal modulation. The system employs a closed cycle refrigerator/heat exchanger to produce −90 °C at the jet. The cooling is done by indirect cooling of gaseous nitrogen (or air) and therefore is capable of modulating volatile and semi volatile compounds over the C7+ range.

=== Flow modulation ===
This is a valve-based approach, where differential flows are used to 'fill' and 'flush' a sample loop. Flow modulation does not suffer from the same volatility restrictions as thermal modulation, as it does not rely on trapping analytes using a cold jet – meaning volatiles <C5 can be efficiently modulated.

=== Modulation period ===
The time required to complete a cycle is called the period of modulation (modulation time) and is actually the time in between two hot pulses, which typically lasts between 2 and 10 seconds is related to the time needed for the compounds to eluted in 2D.

=== Sensitivity ===
Another key aspect of GC x GC that can be highlighted is that the result from the refocusing in the 2D, which occurs during the modulation, causes a significant increase in sensitivity, when thermal modulators are used. The modulation process causes the chromatographic bands in GC × GC systems are 10-50 times closer than in 1D-GC, resulting in values for much better peak widths (FWHM Full Width Half Mass) between 50 ms to 500 ms, which requires detectors with fast response and small internal volumes.

When traditional flow modulators are used, the higher flows used to release the analytes from the trap have a diluting effect and do not produce an increase in sensitivity (GC × GC-FID) in concentration-dependant detectors (e.g. ECD), however there can be an increase in mass-dependant detectors such as FID. As most mass spectrometers cannot handle higher flows from flow modulation a splitting device often needs to be used, greatly reducing the amount of material reaching the MS (1/10th to 1/20th), thus causing a further loss of sensitivity.

== Column set ==
The set of columns can be configured with various types. In the original work, column sets were mainly poly(dimethylsiloxane) in the first dimension and poly(ethyleneglycol) in the second dimension. These so-called straight phase column sets are suitable for hydrocarbon analysis. Therefore, these are still used most frequently in the oil and gas industry. For applications that require the analysis of polar compounds in a non-polar matrix, a reverse-phase column set gives more resolution. The first dimension column in this situation is a polar column, followed by a mid-polar second dimension column. Other applications can be configured differently according to their specific needs. For example, they may include chiral columns for optical isomer separation or PLOT columns for volatiles and gas samples.

== Software ==
Optimizing the application is more complex compared to 1D separations, as there are more parameters involved. Column flow and oven temperature program are both important when using either flow or thermal modulation. However, with thermal modulation, cold jet and hot jet pulse duration, length of the second dimension column and modulation time also affect the final results. In the case of flow modulation, the modulation time, split flow (for MS), loading flow, unloading flow, valve timings are crucial.

The output is also different: the GC×GC technique produces a three-dimensional plot rather than a traditional chromatogram, facilitated by specially designed software packages. For example, GC Image was the first software developed for two dimensional gas chromatography. Some software packages are used in addition to the normal GC (or GC-MS) packages while others are built as a complete platform, controlling all aspects of the analysis. The new and different way of presenting and evaluating data offers additional information. For example, modern software can perform group-type separation as well as automated peak identification (with mass spectrometry).

== Detectors ==
Due to the small width of the peak in the second dimension, suitable detectors are needed. Examples include flame ionization detector (FID), (micro) electron capture detector (μECD) and mass spectrometry analyzers such as fast time of flight (TOF). Several authors have published work using quadrupole Mass Spectrometry (qMS), though some trade-offs have to be accepted as these are much slower.
