= Methanizer =

Methanizer is an appliance used in gas chromatography (GC), which allows the user to detect very low concentrations of carbon monoxide and carbon dioxide. It consists of a flame ionization detector, preceded by a hydrogenating reactor, which converts CO_{2} and CO into methane CH_{4}. Methanizers contain a hydrogenation catalyst to achieve this conversion. Nickel is commonly used as the catalyst and there are alternatives available.

== Chemistry ==
On-line catalytic reduction of carbon monoxide to methane for detection by FID was described by Porter & Volman, who suggested that both carbon dioxide and carbon monoxide could also be converted to methane with the same nickel catalyst. This was confirmed by Johns & Thompson, who determined optimum operating parameters for each of the gases.

CO_{2} + 2H_{2} ↔ CH_{4} + O_{2}

2CO + 4H_{2} ↔ 2CH_{4} + O_{2}

== Typical design ==
The catalyst traditionally consists of a 2% coating of Ni in the form of nickel nitrate deposited on a chromatographic packing material. A 1½" long bed is packed around the bend of an 8"×1/8" SS U-tube. The tube is clamped in a block so that the ends protrude down into the column oven for connection between column or TCD outlet and FID base. Heat is provided by a pair of cartridge heaters and controlled by a temperature controller.

Hydrogen for the reduction can be provided either by adding it via a tee at the inlet to the catalyst (preferred), or by using hydrogen as carrier gas.

== Start-up ==
If the raw catalyst is supplied in the form of nickel oxide, it is necessary to reduce it to metallic nickel before it will operate properly. Alternative catalysts do not necessarily need a reduction treatment. Methanizers should not be heated without hydrogen being supplied to them.

== Operating characteristics ==
=== Temperature ===
Conversion of both CO and CO_{2} to CH_{4} starts at a catalyst temperature below 300°C, but the conversion is incomplete and peak tailing is evident. At around 340°C, conversion is complete, as indicated by area measurements, but some tailing limits the peak height. At 360-380°C, tailing is eliminated and there is little change in peak height up to 400°C. Operating temperatures for various methanizers range from 350-400°C.

Although carbonization of CO has been reported at temperatures above 350°, it is rather a rare phenomenon.

=== Range ===
The conversion efficiency is essentially 100% from minimum detectable levels up to a flow of CO or CO_{2} at the detector of about 5×10^{−5}g/s. These represent a detection limit of about 200 ppb and a maximum concentration of about 10% in a 0.5mL sample. Both values are dependent upon peak width.

=== Catalyst poisoning ===
Nickel catalyst methanizers have been known to undergo deactivation with certain elements and compounds:

- H_{2}S. Very small amounts of H_{2}S, SF_{6}, and probably any other sulfur containing gases, cause immediate and complete deactivation of the catalyst. It is not possible to regenerate a poisoned catalyst that has been deactivated by sulfur, by treating with either oxygen or hydrogen. If sulfur containing gases are present in the sample, a switching valve should be used either to bypass the catalyst, or to back-flush the column to vent after elution of CO_{2}.
- Air or O_{2}. Reports of oxygen poisoning seem to be rather rumors than real facts. Small amounts of air through a catalyst will not kill it but anything over about 5 cc/min will cause an immediate and continual degradation of the catalyst.
- Unsaturated hydrocarbons. Samples of pure ethylene cause immediate, but partial, degradation of the catalyst, evidenced by slight tailing of CO and CO_{2} peaks. The effect of 2 or 3 samples might be tolerable, but since it is cumulative, such gases should be backflushed or bypassed. Low concentrations do not cause any degradation. Samples of pure acetylene affect the catalyst much more severely than does ethylene. Low concentrations have no effect. Probably some carbonization with high concentrations of unsaturates occurs, resulting in the deposit of soot on the catalyst surface. It is likely that aromatics would have the same effect.
- Other compounds. Water has no effect on the catalyst, as well as various Freons and NH_{3}. Here again, with NH_{3}, there is conflicting evidence from some users, who have seen a degradation after several injections, but other researchers were not able to confirm it. As with sulfur containing gases, NH_{3} can be backflushed to vent or bypassed if desired.

Traditional nickel catalyst methanizers are designed to only convert CO and CO_{2} to methane. Due to this limitation, deactivation commonly occurs when other compounds are present in the sample matrix, such as olefins and sulfur containing compounds. Thus, the use of methanizers often requires complex valve systems that may include backflush and heartcutting. Nickel catalyst replacement and conditioning steps are time consuming and require operator skill to perform properly.
