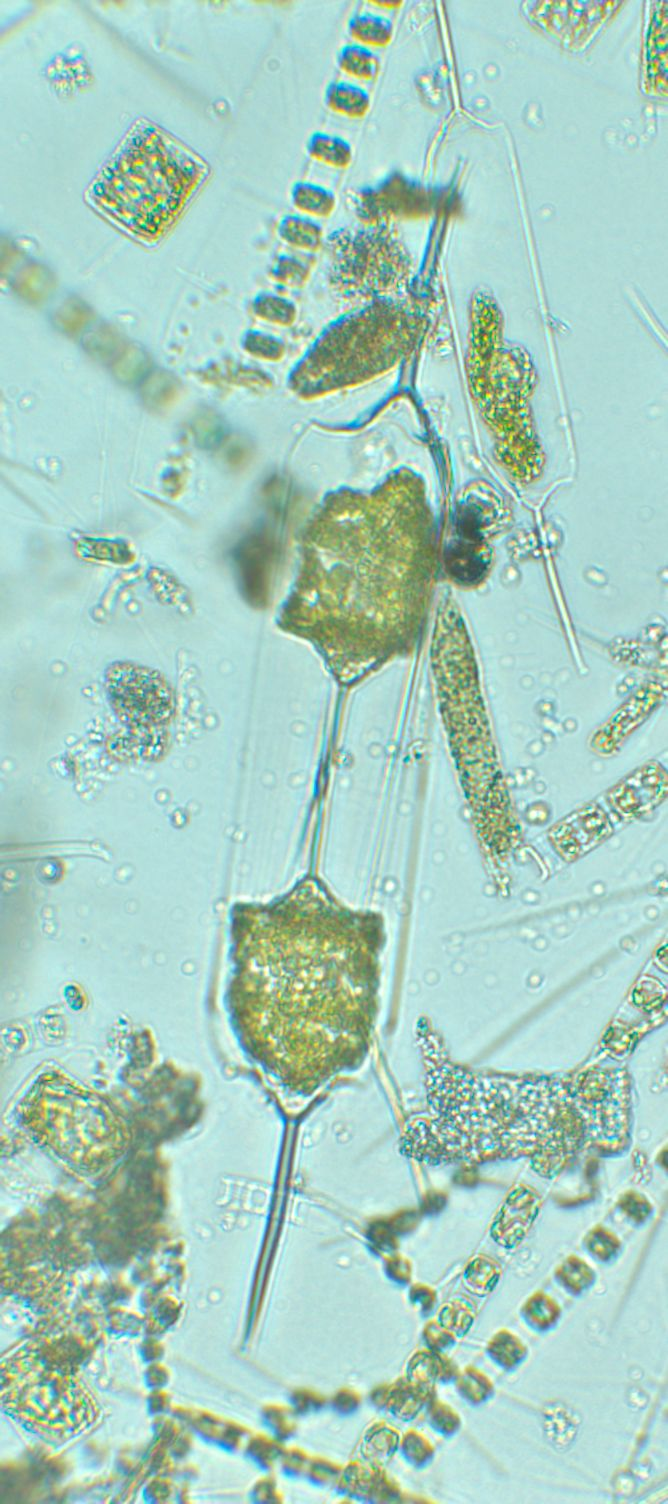

Scientific classification
- Domain: Eukaryota
- Clade: Sar
- Clade: Stramenopiles
- Clade: Ochrophyta
- Division: Diatomeae
- Class: Mediophyceae
- Genus: Ditylum
- Species: D. brightwellii

Binomial name
- Ditylum brightwellii (T.West) Grunow in Van Heurck

= Ditylum brightwellii =

Species of diatom

Ditylum brightwellii is a species of cosmopolitan marine centric diatoms. It is a unicellular photosynthetic autotroph that has the ability to divide rapidly and contribute to spring phytoplankton blooms.

== Description ==
The D. brightwellii cell has a high length to diameter ratio. The cell wall is silicified, as is characteristic of all diatoms. This hard, porous covering is known as the frustule and causes the cell to be more dense than the surrounding water. Oceanic currents and surface winds prevent D. brightwellii cells from sinking beneath the euphotic zone. Cells range in size from 25–100μm in diameter and 80–130μm in length. The valve is most often triangular in shape, but can also be biangular or quadrangular. A long hollow tube called the rimoportula is located centrally and extends from each valve

== Distribution ==
Ditylum brightwellii is found in all global oceans except in polar waters. Genetically distinct populations were observed over the course of a spring bloom in Puget Sound, suggesting that certain genetic lineages are better adapted to certain environmental conditions.

== Life cycle ==
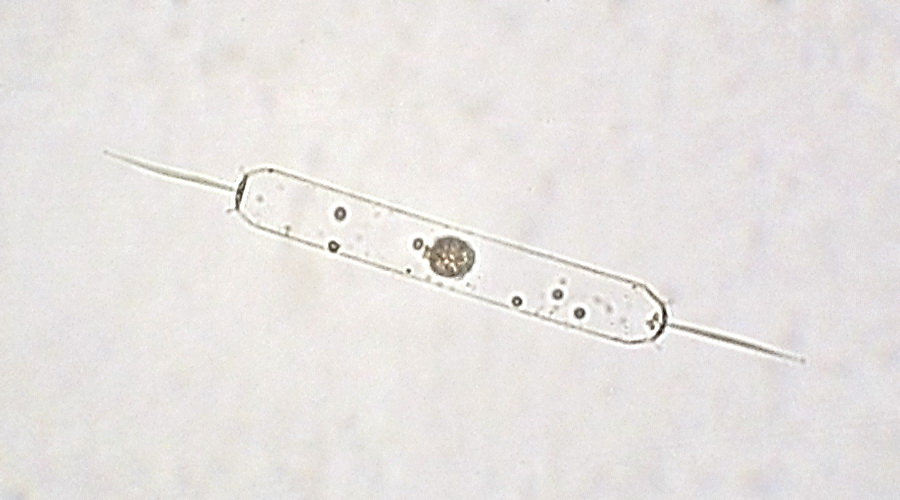
Sample in Black Sea

Ditylum brightwellii reproduces primarily asexually, creating clonal lineages. Vegetative cells are capable of enlargement and may also produce resting spores. However, samples from Puget Sound, WA display high genetic diversity. This is indicative of sexual reproduction (auxospore formation). Clonal isolates have observed to produce both sperm and eggs. Two eggs are produced from each oogonium and 64 sperm are produced from each spermatogonangium. The frequency of sexual reproduction in D. brightwellii is not clear, although conditions including increased nutrients, temperatures ranging from 10 °C-14 °C, and a short photoperiod may be favorable for sexual reproduction.
