= Discharge ionization detector =

A discharge ionization detector (DID) is a type of detector used in gas chromatography.

== Principle ==
A DID is an ion detector which uses a high-voltage electric discharge to produce ions. The detector uses an electrical discharge in helium to generate high energy UV photons and metastable helium which ionizes all compounds except helium. The ions produce an electric current, which is the signal output of the detector. The greater the concentration of the component, the more ions are produced, and the greater the current.

== Application ==
DIDs are sensitive to a broad range of components. In air separation plants, they are used to detect the components CO; CH_{2}; C^{+}; N_{2}; O_{2} in argon product in ppm range.

DIDs are non-destructive detectors. They do not destroy or consume the components they detect. Therefore, they can be used before other detectors in multiple-detector configurations.

DIDs are an improvement over helium ionization detectors in that they contain no radioactive source.
