= Response factor =

Signal ratio used in chromatography

Response factor, usually in chromatography and spectroscopy, is the ratio between a signal produced by an analyte, and the quantity of analyte which produces the signal. Ideally, and for easy computation, this ratio is unity (one). In real-world scenarios, this is often not the case.

== Expression ==
The response factor $f_i$ can be expressed on a molar, volume or mass basis. Where the true amount of sample and standard are equal:

$$f_i = \frac{A_i} {A_{st}} f_{st}$$

where A is the signal (e.g. peak area) and the subscript i indicates the sample and the subscript st indicates the standard. The response factor of the standard is assigned an arbitrary factor, for example 1 or 100. Response factor of sample/Response factor of standard=RRF

== Chromatography ==
One of the main reasons to use response factors is to compensate for the irreproducibility of manual injections into a gas chromatograph (GC). Injection volumes for GCs can be 1 microliter (μL) or less and are difficult to reproduce. Differences in the volume of injected analyte leads to differences in the areas of the peaks in the chromatogram and any quantitative results are suspect.

To compensate for this error, a known amount of an internal standard (a second compound that does not interfere with the analysis of the primary analyte) is added to all solutions (standards and unknowns). This way if the injection volumes (and hence the peak areas) differ slightly, the ratio of the areas of the analyte and the internal standard will remain constant from one run to the next.

This comparison of runs also applies to solutions with different concentrations of the analyte. The area of the internal standard becomes the value to which all other areas are referenced. Below is the mathematical derivation and application of this method.

Consider an analysis of octane (C_{8}H_{18}) using nonane (C_{9}H_{20}) as the internal standard. The 3 chromatograms below are for 3 different samples.

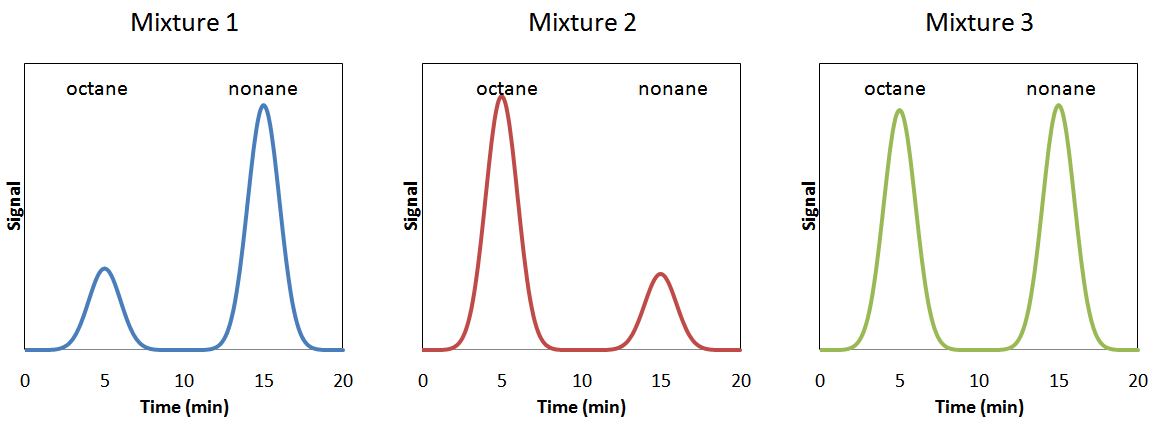

The amount of octane in each sample is different, but the amount of nonane is the same (in practice this is not a requirement). Due to scaling, the areas of the nonane peak appear to have different areas, but in reality the areas are identical. Therefore, the relative amounts of octane in each sample increases in the order of mixture 1 (least) < mixture 3 < mixture 2 (most).

This conclusion is reached because the ratio of the area of octane to that of nonane is the least in mixture 1 and the most, in mixture 2. Mixture 3 has an intermediate ratio. This ratio can be written as $Area_{octane}/Area_{nonane}$.

In chromatography, the area of a peak is proportional to the number of moles (n) times some constant of proportionality (k), Area = k×n. The number of moles of compound is equal to the concentration (c) times the volume, n = cV. From these equations, the following derivation is made:

$${{Area_{octane}} \over {Area_{nonane}}}
={{k_{octane} \times c_{octane} \times V_{octane}} \over {k_{nonane} \times c_{nonane} \times V_{nonane}}}$$

Since both compounds are in the same solution and are injected together, the volume terms are equal and cancel out. The above equation is then rearranged to solve for the ratio of the k's. This ratio is then called the response factor, F.

$$F = {k_{octane} \over k_{nonane}} = {{Area_{octane}/c_{octane}} \over {Area_{nonane}/c_{nonane}}}$$

The response factor, F, is equal to the ratios of the k's, which are constant. Therefore, F is constant. What this means is that regardless of the amounts of octane and nonane in solution, the ratio of the ratios of area to concentration will always yield a constant.

In practice, a solution containing known amounts of both octane and nonane is injected into a GC and a response factor, F, is calculated. Then a separate solution with an unknown amount of octane and a known amount of nonane is injected. The response factor is applied to the data from the second solution and the unknown concentration of the octane is found.

$${\left( {{Area_{octane}/c_{octane}} \over {Area_{nonane}/c_{nonane}}} \right)}_1
= F =
{\left( {{Area_{octane}/c_{octane}} \over {Area_{nonane}/c_{nonane}}} \right)}_2$$

This example deals with the analysis of octane and nonane, but can be applied to any two compounds.
