= Photoionization detector =

Type of gas detector

A photoionization detector or PID is a type of gas detector.

Typical photoionization detectors measure volatile organic compounds and other gases in concentrations from sub parts per billion to 10 000 parts per million (ppm). The photoionization detector is an efficient and inexpensive detector for many gas and vapor analytes. PIDs produce instantaneous readings, operate continuously, and are commonly used as detectors for gas chromatography or as hand-held portable instruments. Hand-held, battery-operated versions are widely used in military, industrial, and confined working facilities for health and safety. Their primary use is for monitoring possible worker exposure to volatile organic compounds (VOCs) such as solvents, fuels, degreasers, plastics and their precursors, heat transfer fluids, lubricants, etc. during manufacturing processes and waste handling.

Portable PIDs are used for monitoring:

- Industrial hygiene and safety
- Environmental contamination and remediation
- Hazardous materials handling
- Ammonia detection
- Lower explosive limit measurements
- Arson investigation
- Indoor air quality
- Cleanroom facility maintenance
- VOCs emitted by Table Tennis rackets

== Principle ==
In a photoionization detector, high-energy photons, typically in the vacuum ultraviolet (VUV) range, break molecules into positively charged ions. As compounds enter the detector they are bombarded by high-energy UV photons and are ionized when they absorb the UV light, resulting in ejection of electrons and the formation of positively charged ions. The ions produce an electric current, which is the signal output of the detector. The greater the concentration of the component, the more ions are produced, and the greater the current. The current is amplified and displayed on an ammeter or digital concentration display. The ions can undergo numerous reactions including reaction with oxygen or water vapor, rearrangement, and fragmentation. A few of them may recapture an electron within the detector to reform their original molecules; however only a small portion of the airborne analytes are ionized to begin with so the practical impact of this (if it occurs) is usually negligible. Thus, PIDs are non-destructive and can be used before other sensors in multiple-detector configurations.

The PID will only respond to components that have ionization energies similar to or lower than the energy of the photons produced by the PID lamp. As stand-alone detectors, PIDs are broad band and not selective, as these may ionize everything with an ionization energy less than or equal to the lamp photon energy. The more common commercial lamps have photons energy upper limits of approximately 8.4 eV, 10.0 eV, 10.6 eV, and 11.7 eV. The major and minor components of clean air all have ionization energies above 12.0 eV and thus do not interfere significantly in the measurement of VOCs, which typically have ionization energies below 12.0 eV.

== Lamp types and detectable compounds ==
PID lamp photon emissions depend on the type of fill gas (which defines the light energy produced) and the lamp window, which affects the energy of photons that can exit the lamp:

Main photon energy	Fill gas	Window material	Comments
11.7 eV	Ar	LiF	Short-lived
10.6 eV	Kr	MgF_{2}	Most robust
10.2 eV	H_{2}	MgF_{2}	
10.0 eV	Kr	CaF_{2}	
9.6 eV	Xe	BaF_{2}	
8.4 eV	Xe	Al_{2}O_{3}	

The 10.6 eV lamp is the most common because it has strong output, has the longest life and responds to many compounds. In approximate order from most sensitive to least sensitive, these compounds include:

- Aromatics
- Olefins
- Bromides and iodides
- Sulfides and mercaptans
- Organic amines
- Ketones
- Ethers
- Esters and acrylates
- Aldehydes
- Alcohols
- Alkanes
- Some inorganics, including NH_{3}, H_{2}S, and PH_{3}

== Applications ==
The first commercial application of photoionization detection was in 1973 as a hand-held instrument for the purpose of detecting leaks of VOCs, specifically vinyl chloride monomer (VCM), at a chemical manufacturing facility. The photoionization detector was applied to gas chromatography (GC) three years later, in 1976. A PID is highly selective when coupled with a chromatographic technique or a pre-treatment tube such as a benzene-specific tube. Broader cuts of selectivity for easily ionized compounds can be obtained by using a lower energy UV lamp. This selectivity can be useful when analyzing mixtures in which only some of the components are of interest.

The PID is usually calibrated using isobutylene, and other analytes may produce a relatively greater or lesser response on a concentration basis. Although many PID manufacturers provide the ability to program an instrument with a correction factor for quantitative detection of a specific chemical, the broad selectivity of the PID means that the user must know the identity of the gas or vapor species to be measured with high certainty. If a correction factor for benzene is entered into the instrument, but hexane vapor is measured instead, the lower relative detector response (higher correction factor) for hexane would lead to underestimation of the actual airborne concentration of hexane.

== Matrix gas effects ==
With a gas chromatograph, filter tube, or other separation technique upstream of the PID, matrix effects are generally avoided because the analyte enters the detector isolated from interfering compounds.

Response to stand-alone PIDs is generally linear from the ppb range up to at least a few thousand ppm. In this range, response to mixtures of components is also linearly additive. At the higher concentrations, response gradually deviates from linearity because of recombination of oppositely charged ions formed in close proximity and/or 2) absorption of UV light without ionization. The signal produced by a PID may be quenched when measuring in high humidity environments, or when a compound such as methane is present in high concentrations of ≥1% by volume This attenuation is due to the ability of water, methane, and other compounds with high ionization energies to absorb the photons emitted by the UV lamp without leading to the production of an ion current. This reduces the number of energetic photons available to ionize target analytes.
