= E. Virginia Armbrust =

Biological oceanographer

E. Virginia Armbrust is a biological oceanographer, professor, and current director of the University of Washington School of Oceanography. She is an elected member of the Washington State Academy of Science, an elected fellow of the American Association for the Advancement of Science, and an elected fellow of the American Academy of Microbiology.

== Education ==
Armbrust obtained a bachelor's degree in human biology at Stanford University in 1980. She then proceeded to obtain a PhD in biological oceanography from the Massachusetts Institute of Technology and Woods Hole Oceanographic Institution in 1990.

== Research career ==
Following her doctorate, Armbrust began working as a postdoctoral researcher. She then became faculty at the University of Washington in 1996 and was elected director of the School of Oceanography in 2011.

Armbrust's current research focuses on phytoplankton and their interactions with bacteria. She is an investigator of the Simons Foundation in microbial oceanography.

She led a project which assembled the genome for a type of marine Euryarchaeota that could not be cultured in the lab. This involved sequencing the genomes of a mixtures of microorganisms from seawater, and assembling related sequence fragments into a complete genome for the marine Euryarchaeota specifically.

== Selected publications ==
- Amin, S.A., L.R. Hmelo, H.M. van Tol, B.P. Durham, L.T. Carlson, K.R. Heal, R.L. Morales, C.T. Berthiaume, M.S. Parker, B. Djunaedi, A.E. Ingalls, M.R. Parsek, M.A. Moran, and E.V. Armbrust. Interaction and signaling between a cosmopolitan phytoplankton and associated bacteria. Nature, 522:98-101 (2015)
- Hennon, G.M.M., J. Ashworth, R.D. Groussman, C. Berthiaume, R.L. Morales, N.S. Baliga, M.V. Orellana, and E.V. Armbrust. Diatom acclimation to elevated CO_{2} via cAMP signaling and coordinated gene expression. Nature Climate Change, 5:761-765 (2015)

== Awards ==
- Rachel Carson Award Lecture, American Geophysical Union (2016)
