= Thermal conductivity detector =

Instrument used in gas chromatography

The thermal conductivity detector (TCD), also known as a katharometer, is a bulk property detector and a chemical specific detector commonly used in gas chromatography. This detector senses changes in the thermal conductivity of the column eluent and compares it to a reference flow of carrier gas. Since most compounds have a thermal conductivity much less than that of the common carrier gases of helium or hydrogen, when an analyte elutes from the column the effluent thermal conductivity is reduced, and a detectable signal is produced.

== Operation ==
The TCD consists of an electrically heated filament in a temperature-controlled cell. Under normal conditions there is a stable heat flow from the filament to the detector body. When an analyte elutes and the thermal conductivity of the column effluent is reduced, the filament heats up and changes resistance. This resistance change is often sensed by a Wheatstone bridge circuit which produces a measurable voltage change. The column effluent flows over one of the resistors while the reference flow is over a second resistor in the four-resistor circuit.

TCD schematic

A schematic of a classic thermal conductivity detector design utilizing a Wheatstone bridge circuit is shown. The reference flow across resistor 4 of the circuit compensates for drift due to flow or temperature fluctuations. Changes in the thermal conductivity of the column effluent flow across resistor 3 will result in a temperature change of the resistor and therefore a resistance change which can be measured as a signal.

Since all compounds, organic and inorganic, have a thermal conductivity different from helium or hydrogen, virtually all compounds can be detected. That's why the TCD is often called a universal detector.

Used after a separation column (in a chromatograph), a TCD measures the concentrations of each compound contained in the sample. Indeed, the TCD signal changes when a compound passes through it, shaping a peak on a baseline. The peak position on the baseline reflects the compound type. The peak area (computed by integrating the TCD signal over time) is representative of the compound concentration. A sample whose compounds concentrations are known is used to calibrate the TCD: concentrations are affected to peak areas through a calibration curve.

The TCD is a good general purpose detector for initial investigations with an unknown sample compared to the FID that will react only to combustible compounds (Ex: hydrocarbons). Moreover, the TCD is a non-specific and non-destructive technique. The TCD is also used in the analysis of permanent gases (argon, oxygen, nitrogen, carbon dioxide) because it responds to all these substances unlike the FID which cannot detect compounds which do not contain carbon-hydrogen bonds.

Considering detection limit, both TCD and FID reach low concentration levels (inferior to ppm or ppb).

Both of them require pressurized carrier gas (Typically: H_{2} for FID, He for TCD) but due to the risk associated with storing H_{2} (high flammability, see Hydrogen safety), TCD with He should be considered in locations where safety is crucial.

=== Considerations ===
One thing to be aware of when operating a TCD is that gas flow must never be interrupted when the filament is hot, as doing so may cause the filament to burn out. While the filament of a TCD is generally chemically passivated to prevent it from reacting with oxygen, the passivation layer can be attacked by halogenated compounds, so these should be avoided wherever possible.

If analyzing for hydrogen, the peak will appear as negative when helium is used as the reference gas. This problem can be avoided if another reference gas is used, for example argon or nitrogen, although this will significantly reduce the detector's sensitivity towards any compounds other than hydrogen.

== Process description ==
It functions by having two parallel tubes both containing gas and heating coils. The gases are examined by comparing the rate of loss of heat from the heating coils into the gas. The coils are arranged in a bridge circuit so that resistance changes due to unequal cooling can be measured. One channel normally holds a reference gas and the mixture to be tested is passed through the other channel.

== Applications ==
Katharometers are used medically in lung function testing equipment and in gas chromatography. The results are slower to obtain compared to a mass spectrometer, but the device is inexpensive, and has good accuracy when the gases in question are known, and it is only the proportion that must be determined.

Monitoring of hydrogen purity in hydrogen-cooled turbogenerators.

Detection of helium loss from the helium vessel of an MRI superconducting magnet.

Also used within the brewing industry to quantify the amount of carbon dioxide within beer samples.

Used within the energy industry to quantify the amount (calorific value) of methane within biogas samples.

Used within the food and drink industry to quantify and/or validate food packaging gases.

Used within the oil&gas industry to quantify the percentage of HCs when drilling into a formation.
