= Flame ionization detector =

Type of gas detector used in gas chromatography

Schematic of a flame ionization detector for gas chromatography.

A flame ionization detector (FID) is a scientific instrument that measures analytes in a gas stream. It is frequently used as a detector in gas chromatography. The measurement of ions per unit time makes this a mass-sensitive instrument. Standalone FIDs can also be used in applications such as landfill gas monitoring, fugitive emissions monitoring and internal combustion engine emissions measurement in stationary or portable instruments.

== History ==
The first flame ionization detectors were developed simultaneously and independently in 1957 by McWilliam and Dewar at Imperial Chemical Industries of Australia and New Zealand (ICIANZ, see Orica history) Central Research Laboratory, Ascot Vale, Melbourne, Australia and by Harley and Pretorius at the University of Pretoria in Pretoria, South Africa.

In 1959, Perkin Elmer Corp. included a flame ionization detector in its Vapor Fractometer.

== Operating principle ==
The operation of the FID is based on the detection of ions formed during combustion of organic compounds in a hydrogen flame. The generation of these ions is proportional to the concentration of organic species in the sample gas stream.

To detect these ions, two electrodes are used to provide a potential difference. The positive electrode acts as the nozzle head where the flame is produced. The other, negative electrode is positioned above the flame. When first designed, the negative electrode was either tear-drop shaped or angular piece of platinum. Today, the design has been modified into a tubular electrode, commonly referred to as a collector plate. The ions thus are attracted to the collector plate and upon hitting the plate, induce a current. This current is measured with a high-impedance picoammeter and fed into an integrator. The manner in which the final data is displayed is based on the computer and software. In general, a graph is displayed that has time on the x-axis and total ion on the y-axis.

The current measured corresponds roughly to the proportion of reduced carbon atoms in the flame. Specifically how the ions are produced is not necessarily understood, but the response of the detector is determined by the number of carbon atoms (ions) hitting the detector per unit time. This makes the detector sensitive to the mass rather than the concentration, which is useful because the response of the detector is not greatly affected by changes in the carrier gas flow rate.

== Response factor ==
FID measurements are usually reported "as methane," meaning as the quantity of methane which would produce the same response. The same quantity of different chemicals produces different amounts of current, depending on the elemental composition of the chemicals. The response factor of the detector for different chemicals can be used to convert current measurements into actual amounts of each chemical.

Hydrocarbons generally have response factors that are equal to the number of carbon atoms in their molecule (more carbon atoms produce greater current), while oxygenates and other species that contain heteroatoms tend to have a lower response factor. Carbon monoxide and carbon dioxide are not detectable by FID.

FID measurements are often labelled "total hydrocarbons" or "total hydrocarbon content" (THC), although a more accurate name would be "total volatile hydrocarbon content" (TVHC), as hydrocarbons which have condensed out are not detected, even though they are important, for example safety when handling compressed oxygen.

== Description ==
FID Schematic: A) Capillary tube; B) Platinum jet; C) Hydrogen; D) Air; E) Flame; F) Ions; G) Collector; H) Coaxial cable to analog-to-digital converter; J) Gas outlet

The design of the flame ionization detector varies from manufacturer to manufacturer, but the principles are the same. Most commonly, the FID is attached to a gas chromatography system.

The eluent exits the gas chromatography column (A) and enters the FID detector’s oven (B). The oven is needed to make sure that as soon as the eluent exits the column, it does not come out of the gaseous phase and deposit on the interface between the column and FID. This deposition would result in loss of eluent and errors in detection. As the eluent travels up the FID, it is first mixed with the hydrogen fuel (C) and then with the oxidant (D). The eluent/fuel/oxidant mixture continues to travel up to the nozzle head where a positive bias voltage exists. This positive bias helps to repel the oxidized carbon ions created by the flame (E) pyrolyzing the eluent. The ions (F) are repelled up toward the collector plates (G) which are connected to a very sensitive ammeter, which detects the ions hitting the plates, then feeds that signal to an amplifier, integrator, and display system(H). The products of the flame are finally vented out of the detector through the exhaust port (J).

== Advantages and disadvantages ==
=== Advantages ===
Flame ionization detectors are used very widely in gas chromatography because of a number of advantages.

- Cost: Flame ionization detectors are relatively inexpensive to acquire and operate.
- Low maintenance requirements: Apart from cleaning or replacing the FID jet, these detectors require little maintenance.
- Rugged construction: FIDs are relatively resistant to misuse.
- Linearity and detection ranges: FIDs can measure organic substance concentration at very low (10^{−13} g/s) and very high levels, having a linear response range of 10^{7} g/s.

=== Disadvantages ===
Flame ionization detectors cannot detect inorganic substances and some highly oxygenated or functionalized species like infrared and laser technology can. In some systems, CO and CO_{2} can be detected in the FID using a methanizer, which is a bed of Ni catalyst that reduces CO and CO_{2} to methane, which can be in turn detected by the FID. The methanizer is limited by its inability to reduce compounds other than CO and CO_{2} and its tendency to be poisoned by a number of chemicals commonly found in gas chromatography effluents.

Another important disadvantage is that the FID flame oxidizes all oxidizable compounds that pass through it; all hydrocarbons and oxygenates are oxidized to carbon dioxide and water and other heteroatoms are oxidized according to thermodynamics. For this reason, FIDs tend to be the last in a detector train and also cannot be used for preparatory work.

=== Alternative solution ===
An improvement to the methanizer is the Polyarc reactor, which is a sequential reactor that oxidizes compounds before reducing them to methane. This method can be used to improve the response of the FID and allow for the detection of many more carbon-containing compounds. The complete conversion of compounds to methane and the now equivalent response in the detector also eliminates the need for calibrations and standards because response factors are all equivalent to those of methane. This allows for the rapid analysis of complex mixtures that contain molecules where standards are not available.

== See also ==
- Active fire protection
- Flame detector
- Gas chromatography
- Photoelectric flame photometer
- Photoionization detector
- Thermal conductivity detector

== Sources ==
- Skoog, Douglas A., F. James Holler, & Stanley R. Crouch. Principles of Instrumental Analysis. 6th Edition. United States: Thomson Brooks/Cole, 2007.
- Halász, I.; Schneider, W. (1961). "Quantitative Gas Chromatographic Analysis of Hydrocarbons with Capillary Column and Flame Ionization Detector". Analytical Chemistry. 33 (8): 978–982. doi:10.1021/ac60176a034.
- G.H. JEFFERY, J.BASSET, J.MENDHAM, R.C.DENNEY, "VOGEL'S TEXTBOOK OF QUANTITATIVE CHEMICAL ANALYSIS."
