= -graphy =

English language suffix

The English suffix -graphy denotes either a field of study or a manner of writing or representation. It derives from the French -graphie, which in turn comes from the Latin -graphia, itself a transliteration of the Greek -γραφία (-graphia).

Because -graphy begins with a consonant, it is usually joined to a combining form that provides the linking vowel -o- (e.g. photo- + -graphy). This follows the pattern of neo-classical word formation, in which new English words are built from Greek and Latin elements in imitation of Greek compound and derivative structures.

== Arts and communication ==
- Biography – an account of a person's life
  - Autobiography – biography of a person written by themselves
    - Autobiogeography – a self-referential map or other geographic document created by the subject
  - Hagiography – biography of a saint or an ecclesiastical leader
  - Metabiography – the study of how biographies are shaped by the temporal, geographical, institutional, intellectual, and ideological contexts of their authors
  - Photobiography – biography told primarily through photographs, often accompanied by brief textual commentary
  - Psychobiography – biographical study that interprets a subject's life and behavior through psychological theory or analysis
- Choreography – the art of creating and arranging dances or ballets.
- Cinematography – the art of making lighting and camera choices when recording photographic images for the cinema
- Floriography – the language of flowers
- Iconography – the art of interpreting the content by icons.
- Klecksography – the art of making images from inkblots.
- Lexicography – the study of lexicons and the art of compiling dictionaries.
- Photography – the art, practice or occupation of taking and printing photographs.
  - Astrophotography – the photography or imaging of astronomical objects
  - Chronophotography – the photographic technique which captures a number of phases of movements
  - Heliography – an early photographic process, based on the hardening of bitumen in sunlight
  - Rephotography – the act of photographing the same site twice, with a time lag between the two images
  - Telephotography – the sending of photographs by telegraph, telephone or radio
- Pornography – the practice, occupation and result of producing sexually arousing imagery or words.
- Pyrography – the art of decorating wood or other materials with burn marks
- Reprography – the reproduction of graphics through mechanical or electrical means
- Scenography – the art of theatrical design and stage scenery
- Tasseography – a divination or fortune-telling method that interprets patterns in tea leaves
- Telegraphy – the long-distance transmission of messages
- Typography – the art and techniques of type design.
- Videography – the art and techniques of filming video.
- Vitrography – a method of using laser beams to create three-dimensional images or designs inside solid glass

=== Printing ===
- Cerography – a printmaking technique using a layer of wax over a metal substrate
- Collagraphy – In printmaking, a fine art technique in which collage materials are used as ink-carrying imagery on a printing plate.
- Flexography – a printing process using a flexible relief plate
- Geomontography – a printing method, used primarily for the production of maps
- Hectography – a duplicating process using gelatin plates
- Lithography – a planographic printing technique
  - Chromolithography – a method for making multi-colour prints in lithography
  - Photolithography – the method for microfabrication in electronics manufacturing.
- Mimeography – a duplicating process using stencils
- Serigraphy – a printmaking technique that uses a stencil made of fine synthetic material through which ink is forced
- Vitreography – in printmaking, a fine art technique that uses glass printing matrices
- Xerography – the means of copying documents
- Zincography – a planographic printing process that used zinc plates

=== Writing ===
- Cacography – bad handwriting or spelling
- Calligraphy – the art of fine handwriting
- Chorography – the art of describing or mapping a region or district
- Dittography – accidental repetition of letters or words when copying text
- Garshunography – the use of the script of one language to write utterances of another language which already has a script associated with it; also known as allography or heterography
- Haplography – accidental omission of repeated letters when writing
- Ideography – the use of symbols to represent a concept or idea.
- Orthography – the rules of correct writing.
- Palaeography – the study of historical handwriting
- Phonography – representation of sounds by written symbols; also known as Pitman shorthand
- Pictography – the use of pictographs
- Pseudepigraphy – falsely attributed writings
- Psychography – a claimed psychic ability allowing a person to produce written words without consciously writing
- Steganography – the art of writing hidden messages
- Stenography – the art of writing in shorthand.

== Archival and compilatory lists ==
- Bibliography – a list of writings, typically those used or considered by an author in preparing a particular work or research.
  - Metabibliography – bibliography of bibliographies.
- Discography – a list of recorded music, or other sound recordings/auditory media.
- Filmography – a list of films, documentaries, or other visual media.
- Ludography (or gameography) – a list of games, specifically video games.
- Webography (also known as webliography or arachniography) – a list of websites, or URLs

== Fields of study ==
- Ampelography – the field of botany concerned with the identification and classification of grapevines
- Cartography – the study and making of maps.
- Chromatography – a chemical laboratory technique for the separation of a mixture
  - Electrochromatography
- Cryptography – the study of securing information
- Crystallography – the study of crystals
- Dactylography – the study of fingerprints for identification
- Demography – the study of the characteristics of human populations, such as size, growth, density, distribution, and vital statistics
- Epigraphy – the study of written inscriptions on hard surfaces.
- Ethnography – the study of cultures and cultural phenomena.
- Geography – study of the lands, features, inhabitants, and phenomena of the Earth.
  - Anthropogeography – study of human society's interactions and relationships with the environment.
  - Biogeography – study of the distribution of species and ecosystems in geographic space and through geological time
  - Oceanography – exploration and scientific study of the ocean and its phenomena.
  - Orography – the study of mountains.
  - Physiography – study of the processes and patterns in the Earth's environment.
  - Stratigraphy — a branch of geology concerned with the study of rock layers (strata) and layering (stratification)
    - Lithostratigraphy — a sub-discipline of stratigraphy
    - Stratigraphy (archaeology) — study of archaeological sedimentation for dating purposes
- Historiography – study of the methods of historians
- Holography – a technique for recording and reconstructing wavefronts, best known for generating three-dimensional images (holograms)
- Hydrography – measurement and description of any waters.
- Keraunography – the belief that lightning, when striking an object, can leave markings which constitute a photographic image of surrounding objects
- Monography – the study of a single specialized subject of the aspect of a subject.
- Pathography – study of the history of an individual or community with regard to the influence of a physical or mental condition.
- Polarography – a type of voltammetry
- Reprography – reproduction of graphics through mechanical or electrical means.
- Topography – the study of Earth's surface shape and features or those of planets, moons and asteroids.
- Zoography – the study of animal description and their habits; descriptive zoology.

=== Astronomy ===
- Areography – the study and mapping of the physical features of the planet Mars
- Cosmography – the study and making of maps of the universe or cosmos
- Selenography – the study and mapping of the physical features of the Moon
- Uranography – the study and mapping of stars and space objects

=== Imaging techniques ===
- Radiography – an imaging technique that uses X-rays, other ionizing radiation, or non-ionizing radiation to visualize the internal structure of an object
  - Autoradiography – a photographic record of radiation from a radioactive source made by placing it close to a photographic emulsion
- Thermography – a technique that records infrared radiation emitted from an object's surface to generate a temperature distribution image
- Tomography – three-dimensional imaging

=== Medical tests ===
- Angiography – a medical imaging technique used to visualize the inside, or lumen, of blood vessels and organs of the body, particularly the arteries and the heart chambers
- Cholangiography – imaging of bile ducts
- Electroencephalography – recording of voltages from the brain
- Electromyography – a technique for evaluating and recording the electrical activity produced by skeletal muscles
- Mammography – an x-ray method used to examine the breast for detection of early-stage cancer and other diseases.
- Urography – an examination with an x-ray to evaluate the kidneys, ureters and bladder.
- Venography – a test that uses an x-ray moving pictures of blood in the veins of the legs and pelvis.
- Ultrasonography – a test that uses energy sound waves to observe tissues and organs.

== See also ==
- -ism
- -ology
- -logy
- List of words with the suffix -ology
