= Monolithic HPLC column =

Column used in high-performance liquid chromatography

A monolithic HPLC column, or monolithic column, is a column used in high-performance liquid chromatography (HPLC). The internal structure of the monolithic column is created in such a way that many channels form inside the column. The material inside the column which separates the channels can be porous and functionalized. In contrast, most HPLC configurations use particulate packed columns; in these configurations, tiny beads of an inert substance, typically a modified silica, are used inside the column. Monolithic columns can be broken down into two categories, silica-based and polymer-based monoliths. Silica-based monoliths are known for their efficiency in separating smaller molecules while, polymer-based are known for separating large protein molecules.

== Technology overview ==
In analytical chromatography, the goal is to separate and uniquely identify each of the compounds in a substance. Alternatively, preparative scale chromatography is a method of purification of large batches of material in a production environment. The basic methods of separation in HPLC rely on a mobile phase (water, organic solvents, etc.) being passed through a stationary phase (particulate silica packings, monoliths, etc.) in a closed environment (column); the differences in reactivity among the solvent of interest and the mobile and stationary phases distinguish compounds from one another in a series of adsorption and desorption phenomena. The results are then visually displayed in a resulting chromatogram. Stationary phases are available in many varieties of packing styles as well as chemical structures and can be functionalized for added specificity. Monolithic-style columns, or monoliths, are one of many types of stationary phase structure.

Monoliths, in chromatographic terms, are porous rod structures characterized by mesopores and macropores. These pores provide monoliths with high permeability, a large number of channels, and a high surface area available for reactivity. The backbone of a monolithic column is composed of either an organic or inorganic substrate in, and can easily be chemically altered for specific applications. Their unique structure gives them several physico-mechanical properties that enable them to perform competitively against traditionally packed columns.

Historically, the typical HPLC column consists of high-purity particulate silica compressed into stainless steel tubing. To decrease run times and increase selectivity, smaller diffusion distances have been pursued. To achieve smaller diffusion distances there has been a decrease in the particle sizes. However, as the particle size decreases, the backpressure (for a given column diameter and a given volumetric flow) increases proportionally. Pressure is inversely proportional to the square of the particle size; i.e., when particle size is halved, pressure increases by a factor of four. This is because as the particle sizes get smaller, the interstitial voids (the spaces between the particles) do as well, and it is harder to push the compounds through the smaller spaces. Modern HPLC systems are generally designed to withstand about 18,000 pounds per square inch (1,200 bar) of backpressure in order to deal with this problem.

Monoliths also have very short diffusion distances, while also providing multiple pathways for solute dispersion. Packed particle columns have pore connectivity values of about 1.5, while monoliths have values ranging from 6 to greater than 10. This means that, in a particulate column, a given analyte may diffuse into and out of the same pore, or enter through one pore and exit through a connected pore. By contrast, an analyte in a monolith is able to enter one channel and exit through any of 6 or more different venues. Little of the surface area in a monolith is inaccessible to compounds in the mobile phase. The high degree of interconnectivity in monoliths confers an advantage seen in the low backpressures and readily achievable high flow rates.

Monoliths are ideally suited for large molecules; although the purification of larger molecules can be very time-consuming. As mentioned previously, particle sizes are decreasing in an attempt to achieve higher resolution and faster separations, which led to higher backpressures. When the smaller particle sizes are used to separate biomolecules, backpressures increase further because of the large molecule size. In monoliths, where backpressures are low and channel sizes are large, small molecule separations are less efficient. This is demonstrated by the dynamic binding capacities, a measure of how much sample can bind to the surface of the stationary phase. Dynamic binding capacities of monoliths for large molecules can be an order of ten times greater than that for particulate packings.

Monoliths exhibit no shear forces or eddying effects. High interconnectivity of the mesopores allows for multiple avenues of convective flow through the column. Mass transport of solutes through the column is relatively unaffected by flow rate. This is completely at odds to traditional particulate packings, whereby eddy effects and shear forces contribute greatly to the loss of resolution and capacity, as seen in the vanDeemter curve. Monoliths can, however, suffer from a different flow disadvantage: wall effects. Silica monoliths, especially, have a tendency to pull away from the sides of their column encasing. When this happens, the flow of the mobile phase occurs around the stationary phase as well as through it, decreasing resolution. Wall effects have been reduced greatly by advances in column construction.

Other advantages of monoliths conferred by their individual construction include greater column to column and batch to batch reproducibility. One technique of creating monolith columns is to polymerize the structure in situ. This involves filling the mold or column tubing with a mixture of monomers, a cross-linking agent, a free-radical initiator, and a porogenic solvent, then initiating the polymerization process under carefully controlled thermal or irradiating conditions. Monolithic in situ polymerization avoids the primary source of column to column variability, which is the packing procedure.

Additionally, packed particle columns must be maintained in a solvent environment and cannot be exposed to air during or after the packing procedure. If exposed to air, the pores dry out and no longer provide adequate surface area for reactivity; the column must be repacked or discarded. Further, because particle compression and packing uniformity are not relevant to monoliths, they exhibit greater mechanical robustness; if particulate columns are dropped, for example, the integrity of the column may be corrupted. Monolithic columns are more physically stable than their particulate counterparts.

== Technology development ==
The roots of liquid chromatography extend back over a century ago to 1900, when Russian botanist Mikhail Tsvet began experimenting with plant pigments in chlorophyll. He noted that, when a solvent was applied, distinct bands appeared that migrated at different rates along a stationary phase. For this new observation, he coined the term “chromatography,” a colored picture. His first lecture on the subject was presented in 1903, but his most important contribution occurred three years later, in 1906, when the paper “Adsorption analysis and chromatographic method. Applications on the chemistry of chlorophyll,” was published. Rivalry with a colleague who readily and vocally denounced his work meant that chromatographic analysis was shelved for almost 25 years. The great irony of the matter is that it was his rival's students who later took up the chromatography banner in their work with carotins.

Greatly unchanged from Tswett's time until the 1940s, normal phase chromatography was performed by passing a gravity-fed solvent through small glass tubes packed with pellicular adsorbent beads. It was in the 1940s, however, that there was a great revolution in gas chromatography (GC). Although GC was a wonderful technique for analyzing inorganic compounds, less than 20% of organic molecules are able to be separated using this technique. It was Richard Synge, who in 1952 won the Nobel Prize in Chemistry for his work with partition chromatography, who applied the theoretical knowledge gained from his work in GC to LC. From this revolution, the 1950s also saw the advent of paper chromatography, reversed-phase partition chromatography (RPC), and hydrophobic interaction chromatography (HIC). The first gels for use in LC were created using cross-linked dextrans (Sephadex) in an attempt to realize Synge's prediction that a unique single-piece stationary phase could provide an ideal chromatographic solution.

In the 1960s, polyacrylamide and agarose gels were created in a further attempt to create a single-piece stationary phase, but the purity of and stability of available components did not prove useful for implementation in the HPLC. In this decade, affinity chromatography was invented, an ultra-violet (UV) detector was used for the first time in conjunction with LC, and, most importantly, the modern HPLC was born. Csaba Horvath led the development of modern HPLC by piecing together laboratory equipment to suit his purposes. In 1968, Picker Nuclear Company marketed the first commercially available HPLC as a “Nucleic Acid Analyzer.” The following year, the first international symposia on HPLC was held, and Kirkland at DuPont was able to functionalize controlled porosity pellicular particles for the first time.

The 1970s and 1980s witnessed a renewed interest in separations media with reduced interparticular void volumes. Perfusion chromatography showed, for the first time, that chromatography media could support high flow rates without sacrificing resolution. Monoliths aptly fit into this new class of media, as they exhibit no void volume and can withstand flow rates up to 9mL/minute. Polymeric monoliths as they exist today were developed independently by three different labs in the late 1980s led by Hjerten, Svec, and Tennikova. Simultaneously, bioseparations became increasingly important, and monolith technologies proved beneficial in biotechnology separations.

Though industry focus in the 1980s was on biotechnology, focus in the 1990s shifted to process engineering. While mainstream chromatographers were using 3μm particulate columns, sub-2μm columns were in research phase. The smaller particles meant better resolution and shorter run times; there was also an associated increase in backpressure. In order to withstand the pressure, a new field of chromatography came into being: UHPLC or UPLC- ultra high pressure liquid chromatography. The new instruments were able to endure pressures of up to 15,000 pounds per square inch (1,000 bar), as opposed to conventional machines, which, as previously state, can hold up to 5,000 pounds per square inch (340 bar). UPLC is an alternative solution to the same problems monolithic columns solve. Similarly to UPLC, monolith chromatography can help the bottom line by increasing sample throughput, but without the need to spend capital on new equipment.

In 1996, Nobuo Tanaka, at the Kyoto Institute of Technology, prepared silica monoliths using a colloidal suspension synthesis (aka “sol-gel”) developed by a colleague. The process is different from that used in polymeric monoliths. Polymeric monoliths, as mentioned above, are created in situ, using a mixture of monomers and a porogen within the column tubing. Silica monoliths, on the other hand, are created in a mold, undergo a significant amount of shrinkage, and are then clad in a polymeric shrink tubing like PEEK (polyetheretherketone) to reduce wall effects. This method limits the size of columns that can be produced to less than 15 cm long, and though standard analytical inner diameters are readily achieved, there is currently a trend in developing nanoscale capillary and prep scale silica monoliths.

== Technology life cycle ==
Silica monoliths have only been commercially available since 2001, when Merck began their Chromolith campaign. The Chromolith technology was licensed from Soga and Nakanishi's group at Kyoto University. The new product won the PittCon Editors’ Gold Award for Best New Product, as well as an R&D 100 Award, both in 2001.

Individual monolith columns have a life cycle that generally exceeds that of its particulate competitors. When selecting an HPLC column supplier, column lifetime was second only to column-to-column reproducibility in importance to the purchaser. Chromolith columns, for example, have demonstrated reproducibility of 3,300 sample injections and 50,000 column volumes of mobile phase. Also important to the life cycle of the monolith is its increased mechanical robustness; polymeric monoliths are able to withstand pH ranges from 1 to 14, can endure elevated temperatures, and do not need to be handled delicately. “Monoliths are still teenagers,” affirms Frantisec Svec, a leader in the field of novel stationary phases for LC.

== Industry evolution ==
Liquid chromatography as we know it today really got its start in 1969, when the first modern HPLC was designed and marketed as a nucleic acid analyzer. Columns throughout the 1970s were unreliable, pump flow rates were inconsistent, and many biologically active compounds escaped detection by UV and fluorescence detectors. Focus on purification methods in the '70s morphed into faster analyses in the 1980s, when computerized controls were integrated into HPLC equipment. Higher degrees of computerization then led to emphasis on more precise, faster, automated equipment in the 1990s. Atypical of many technologies of the '60s and '70s, the emphasis in improvements was not on “bigger and better,” but on “smaller and better”. At the same time the HPLC user-interface was improving, it was critical to be able to isolate hundreds of peptides or biomarkers from ever decreasing sample sizes.

Laboratory analytical instrumentation has only been recognized as a separate and distinct industry by NAICS and SIC since 1987. This market segmentation includes not only gas and liquid chromatography, but also mass spectrometry and spectrophotometric instruments. Since first recognized as a separate market, sales of analytical laboratory equipment increased from about $3.5 billion in 1987 to more than $26 billion in 2004. Revenues in the world liquid chromatography market, specifically, are expected to grow from $3.4 billion in 2007 to $4.7 billion in 2013, with a slight decrease in spending expected in 2008 and 2009 from the worldwide economic slump and decreased or stagnant spending. The pharmaceutical industry alone accounts for 35% of all the HPLC instruments in use. The main source of growth in LC stems from biosciences and pharmaceutical companies.

== Technology applications ==
In its earliest form, liquid chromatography was used to separate the pigments of chlorophyll by a Russian botanist. Decades later, other chemists used the procedure for the study of carotins. Liquid chromatography was then used for the isolation of small molecules and organic compounds like amino acids, and most recently has been used in peptide and DNA research. Monolith columns have been instrumental in advancing the field of biomolecular research.

In recent trade shows and international meetings for HPLC, interest in column monoliths and biomolecular applications has grown steadily, and this correlation is no coincidence. Monoliths have been shown to possess great potential in the “omics” fields- genomics, proteomics, metabolomics, and pharmacogenomics, among others. The reductionist approach to understanding the chemical pathways of the body and reactions to different stimuli, like drugs, are essential to new waves of healthcare like personalized medicine.

Pharmacogenomics studies how responses to pharmaceutical products differ in efficacy and toxicity based on variations in the patient's genome; it is a correlation of drug response to gene expression in a patient. Jeremy K. Nicholson of the Imperial College, London, used a postgenomic viewpoint to understand adverse drug reactions and the molecular basis of human disesase. His group studied gut microbial metabolic profiles and were able to see distinct differences in reactions to drug toxicity and metabolism even among various geographical distributions of the same race. Affinity monolith chromatography provides another approach to drug response measurements. David Hage at the University of Nebraska–Lincoln binds ligands to monolithic supports and measures the equilibrium phenomena of binding interactions between drugs and serum proteins. A monolith-based approach at the University of Bologna, Italy, is currently in use for high-speed screening of drug candidates in the treatment of Alzheimer's. In 2003, Regnier and Liu of Purdue University described a multi-dimensional LC procedure for identifying single nucleotide polymorphisms (SNPs) in proteins. SNPs are alterations in the genetic code that can sometimes cause changes in protein conformation, as is the case with sickle cell anemia. Monoliths are particularly useful in these kinds of separations because of their superior mass transport capabilities, low backpressures coupled with faster flow rates, and relative ease of modification of the support surface.

Bioseparations on a production scale are enhanced by monolith column technologies as well. The fast separations and high resolving power of monoliths for large molecules means that real-time analysis on production fermentors is possible.Fermentation is well known for its use in making alcoholic beverages, but is also an essential step in the production of vaccines for rabies and other viruses. Real-time, on-line analysis is critical for monitoring of production conditions, and adjustments can be made if necessary. Boehringer Ingelheim Austria has validated a method with cGMP (commercial good manufacturing practices) for production of pharmaceutical-grade DNA plasmids. They are able to process 200L of fermentation broth on an 800mL monolith. At BIA Separations, processing time of the tomato mosaic virus decreased considerably from the standard five days of manually intensive work to equivalent purity and better recovery in only two hours with a monolith column. Other viruses have been purified on monoliths as well.

Affinity monoliths have also been applied to the isolation of nanoscale particles from human plasma. Tandem monolithic disks functionalized with chondroitin-6-sulfate and anti-apolipoprotein B-100 antibodies enabled the selective isolation of low-density lipoprotein in less than 30 minutes, while a monolith carrying an anti-CD61 antibody isolated platelet-derived extracellular vesicles in 19 minutes. Monolithic disks carrying antibodies against apoB-100, CD9, or CD61 were subsequently coupled online to asymmetric flow field-flow fractionation, allowing automated isolation and size fractionation of lipoproteins and extracellular-vesicle subpopulations. Extracellular-vesicle fractions obtained using these monolith-based systems have also been characterized by Raman spectroscopy and comprehensive two-dimensional gas chromatography, and used in quartz crystal microbalance studies of binding between extracellular-vesicle subpopulations and affinity ligands. A detailed protocol for the automated monolith–field-flow fractionation method for isolation of extracellular vesicles (including e.g., exosomes and exomeres) was published in 2023.

Another area of interest for HPLC is forensics. GC-MS (Gas Chromatography-Mass Spectroscopy) is generally considered the gold standard for forensic analysis. It is used in conjunction with online databases for rapid analysis of compounds in tests for blood alcohol, cause of death, street drugs, and food analysis, especially in poisoning cases. Analysis of buprenorphine, a heroin substitute, demonstrated the potential utility of multidimensional LC as a low-level detection method. HPLC methods can measure this compound at 40 ng/mL, compared to GC-MS at 0.5 ng/mL, but LC-MS-MS can detect buprenorphine at levels as low as 0.02 ng/mL. The sensitivity of multidimensional LC is therefore 2000 times greater than that of conventional HPLC.

== Industry applications ==
The liquid chromatography marketplace is incredibly diverse. Five to ten firms are consistently market leaders, yet nearly half of the market is made up of small, fragmented companies. This section of the report will focus on the roles that a few companies have had in bringing monolith column technologies to the commercial market.

In 1998, start-up biotechnology company BIA Separations of Ljubljana, Slovenia, came into being. The technology was originally developed by Tatiana Tennikova and Frantisek Svec during a collaboration between their respective institutes. The patent for these columns was acquired by BIA Separations and Ales Podgornik and Milos Barut developed the first commercially available monolith column in the form of a short disc encapsulated in a plastic housing. Trademarked CIM, BIA Separations has since introduced full lines of reversed-phase, normal-phase, ion-exchange, and affinity polymeric monoliths. Ales Podgornik and Janez Jancar then went on to develop large scale tube monolithic columns for industrial use. The largest column currently available is 8L. In May 2008, LC instrumentation powerhouse Agilent technologies agreed to market BIA Separations’ analytical columns based on monolith technology. Agilent's commercialized the columns with strong and weak ion exchange phases and Protein A in September 2008 when they unveiled their new Bio-Monolith product line at the BioProcess International conference.

While BIA Separations was the first to commercially market polymeric monoliths, Merck KGaA was the first company to market silica monoliths. In 1996, Tanaka and coworkers at the Kyoto Institute of Technology published extensive work on silica monolith technologies. Merck was later issued a license from Kyoto Institute of Technology to develop and produce the silica monoliths. Promptly thereafter, in 2001, Merck introduced its Chromolith line of monolithic HPLC columns at analytical instrumentation trade show PittCon. Initially, says Karin Cabrera, senior scientist at Merck, the high flow rate was the selling point for the Chromolith line. Based on customer feedback, though, Merck soon learned that the columns were more stable and longer-lived than particle-packed columns. The columns were the recipients of various new product awards. Difficulties in production of the silica monoliths and tight patent protection have precluded attempts by other companies at developing a similar product. It has been noted that there are more patents concerning how to encapsulate the silica rod than there are on the manufacture of the silica itself.

Historically, Merck has been known for its superior chemical products, and, in liquid chromatography, for the purity and reliability of its particulate silica. Merck is not known for its LC columns. Five years after the introduction of its Chromolith line, Merck made a very strategic marketing decision. They granted a worldwide sublicense of the technology to a small (less than $100M in sales), innovative company well known for its cutting-edge column technology: Phenomenex. This was a superior strategic move for two reasons. As mentioned above, Merck is not well known for its column manufacturing. Furthermore, having more than one silica monolith manufacturer serves to better validate the technology. Having sublicensed the technology from Merck, Phenomenex introduced its Onyx product line in January 2005.

On the other side of monolith technologies are the polymerics. Unlike the inorganic silica columns, the polymer monoliths are made of an organic polymer base. Dionex, traditionally known for its ion chromatography capabilities, has led this side of the field. In the 1990s, Dionex first acquired a license for the polymeric monolith technology developed by leading monolithic chromatography researcher Frantisec Svec while he was at Cornell University. In 2000, they acquired LC Packings, whose competencies were in LC column packings. LC Packings/Dionex revealed their first monolithic capillary column at the Montreux LC-MS Conference. Earlier that year, another company, Isco, introduced a polystyrene divinylbenzene (PS-DVB) monolith column under the brand SWIFT. In January 2005, Dionex was sold the rights to Teledyne Isco's SWIFT media products, intellectual property, technology, and related assets. Though the core competencies of Dionex have traditionally been in ion chromatography, through strategic acquisitions and technology transfers, it has quickly established itself as the primary producer of polymeric monoliths.

== Economic impact ==
Though the many advances of HPLC and monoliths are highly visible within the confines of the analytical and pharmaceutical industries, it is unlikely that general society is aware of these developments. Currently, consumers may witness technology developments in the analytical sciences industry in the form of a broader array of available pharmaceutical products of higher purity, advanced forensic testing in criminal trials, better environmental monitoring, and faster returns on medical tests. In the future, presumably, this may not be the case. As medicine becomes more individualized over time, consumer awareness that something is improving their quality of care seems more likely. The further thought that monoliths or HPLC are involved is unlikely to concern the general public, however.

There are two main cost drivers behind technological change in this industry. Though many different analytical areas use LC, including food and beverage industries, forensics labs, and clinical testing facilities, the largest impetus toward technology developments comes from the research and development and production arms of the pharmaceutical industry. The areas in which high-throughput monolithic column technologies are likely to have the largest economic impact are R&D and downstream processing.

From the Research and Development field comes the desire for more resolved, faster separations from smaller sample quantities. The only phase of drug development under direct control of a pharmaceutical company is the R&D stage. The goal of analytical work is to obtain as much information as possible from the sample. At this stage, high-throughput and analysis of tiny sample quantities are critical. Pharmaceutical companies are looking for tools that will better enable them to measure and predict the efficacy of candidate drugs in shorter times and with less expensive clinical trials. To this end, nano-scale separations, highly automated HPLC equipment, and multi-dimensional chromatography have become influential.

The prevailing method to increase the sensitivity of analytical methods has been multi-dimensional chromatography. This practice uses other analysis techniques in conjunction with liquid chromatography. For example, mass spectrometry (MS) has very much gained in popularity as an on-line analytical technique following HPLC. It is limited, however, in that MS, like nuclear magnetic resonance spectroscopy (NMR) or electrospray ionization techniques (ESI), is only feasible when using very small quantities of solute and solvent; LC-MS is used with nano or capillary scale techniques, but cannot be used in prep-scale. Another tactic for increasing selectivity in multi-dimensional chromatography is to use two columns with different selectivity orthogonally; ie... linking an ion exchange column to a C18 endcapped column. In 2007, Karger reported that, through multi-dimensional chromatography and other techniques, starting with only about 12,000 cells containing 1-4μg of protein, he was able to identify 1867 unique proteins. Of those, Karger can isolate 4 that may be of interest as cervical cancer markers. Today, liquid chromatographers using multi-dimensional LC can isolate compounds at the femtomole (10^{−15} mole) and attomole (10^{−18} mole) levels.

After a drug has been approved by the U.S. Food and Drug Administration (FDA), the emphasis at a pharmaceutical company is on getting a product to market. This is where prep or process scale chromatography has a role. In contrast to analytical analysis, preparatory scale chromatography focuses on isolation and purity of compounds. There is a trade-off between the degree of purity of compound and the amount of time required to achieve that purity. Unfortunately, many of the preparatory or process scale solutions used by pharmaceutical companies are proprietary, due to difficulties in patenting a process. Hence, there is not a great deal of literature available. However, some attempts to address the problems of prep scale chromatography include monoliths and simulated moving beds.

A comparison of immunoglobulin protein capture on a conventional column and a monolithic column yields some economically interesting results. If processing times are equivalent, process volumes of IgG, an antibody, are 3,120L for conventional columns versus 5,538L for monolithic columns. This represents a 78% increase in process volume efficiency, while at the same time only a tenth of the media waste volume is generated. Not only is the monolith column more economically prudent when considering the value of product processing times, but, at the same time, less media is used, representing a significant reduction in variable costs.
