= Polypure =

Norwegian manufacturing company

Polypure AS.
- Company type: Privately held
- Industry: Pharmaceutical
- Founded: 1999
- Headquarters: Oslo, Norway
- Area served: Global
- Key people: Erik Agner (CEO)
- Products: Fine chemicals
- Website: polypure.no

Polypure is a Norwegian company that manufactures and markets monodisperse PEG (polyethylene glycol) derivatives for applications in nanotechnology, biotechnology and in pharmaceutical sciences.

Its headquarters are located in the Oslo Innovation Center, Oslo, Norway. The company has been in operation since 1999.

The compounds are produced using a proprietary purification technology called Sample Displacement Chromatography (SDC). The technique exploits the correlation between molecular weight and binding strength of PEG species. That is, individual PEG molecules bind to the matrix within a chromatography column at differing affinity depending on their molecular weight. Because of this property, when PEG is applied to the top of a chromatography column, strong binding species take possession of the first binding positions available and thereby force weaker binders to follow the liquid flow down the column to the next vacant positions. This results in the spatial separation of PEG species within the column according to affinity and thereby molecular weight.

Monodisperse PEG products are used as linkers or molecular tethers to join molecular entities (as in Cipriano and Dunn). They are also coupled to substances to make use of the hydrophilic property of PEG to enhance water solubility, or to facilitate penetration of a coupled substance through cell membranes as well as to reduce immunogenicity of proteins used as therapeutic agents.

The major shareholders in the company are Erik Agner, co-founder and CEO of the Company, and Gamma Group AS.
