= HPMC (disambiguation) =

Hydroxypropyl methylcellulose (HPMC), or hypromellose, is a semisynthetic, inert, viscoelastic polymer used as eye drops

HPMC may also refer to:

- Himachal Pradesh Medical College, now Indira Gandhi Medical College
- Himachal Pradesh Horticultural Produce Marketing and Processing Corporation Ltd.
- High Performance Monolith Chromatography, a product of the company BIA Separations
