= Capillary electrochromatography =

Method of separating components of a mixture via electro-osmosis

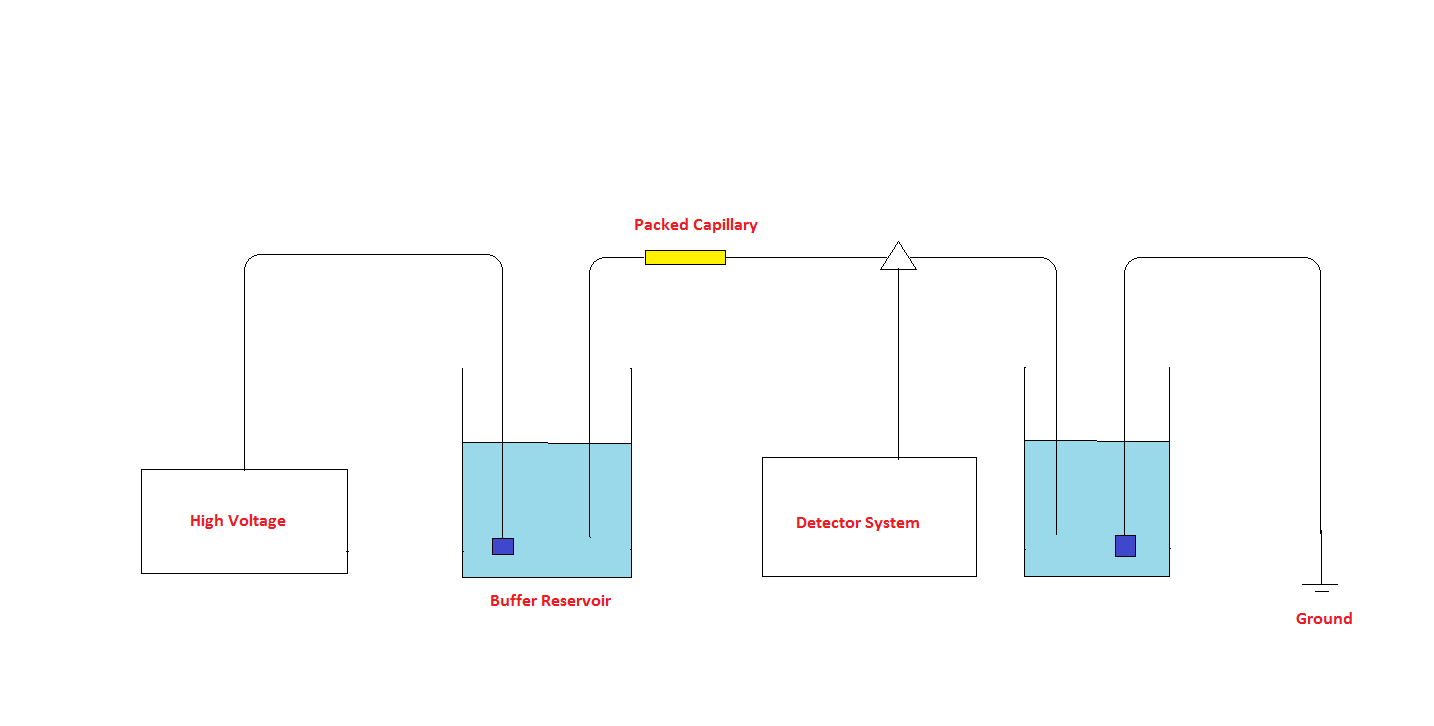
Mechanism of capillary electrochromatography

In chemical analysis, capillary electrochromatography (CEC) is a chromatographic technique in which the mobile phase is driven through the chromatographic bed by electro-osmosis. Capillary electrochromatography is a combination of two analytical techniques, high-performance liquid chromatography and capillary electrophoresis. Capillary electrophoresis aims to separate analytes on the basis of their mass-to-charge ratio by passing a high voltage across ends of a capillary tube, which is filled with the analyte. High-performance liquid chromatography separates analytes by passing them, under high pressure, through a column filled with stationary phase. The interactions between the analytes and the stationary phase and mobile phase lead to the separation of the analytes. In capillary electrochromatography capillaries, packed with HPLC stationary phase, are subjected to a high voltage. Separation is achieved by electrophoretic migration of solutes and differential partitioning.

== Principle ==
Capillary electrochromatography (CEC) combines the principles used in HPLC and CE. The mobile phase is driven across the chromatographic bed using electroosmosis instead of pressure (as in HPLC). Electroosmosis is the motion of liquid induced by an applied potential across a porous material, capillary tube, membrane or any other fluid conduit. Electroosmotic flow is caused by the Coulomb force induced by an electric field on net mobile electric charge in a solution. Under alkaline conditions, the surface silanol groups of the fused silica will become ionised leading to a negatively charged surface. This surface will have a layer of positively charged ions in close proximity which are relatively immobilised. This layer of ions is called the Stern layer. The thickness of the double layer is given by the formula:

$$\delta=\sqrt{\frac{\epsilon_r\epsilon_0RT}{2cF^2 }}$$

where ε_{r} is the relative permittivity of the medium, ε_{o} is the permittivity of vacuum, R is the universal gas constant, T is the absolute temperature, c is the molar concentration, and F is the Faraday constant

When an electric field is applied to the fluid (usually via electrodes placed at inlets and outlets), the net charge in the electrical double layer is induced to move by the resulting Coulomb force. The resulting flow is termed electroosmotic flow. In CEC positive ions of the electrolyte added along with the analyte accumulate in the electrical double layer of the particles of the column packing on application of an electric field they move towards the cathode and drag the liquid mobile phase with them.

The relationship between the linear velocity u of the liquid in the capillary and the applied electric field is given by the Smoluchowski equation as

$$u = \epsilon_r\epsilon_0 \zeta E \eta$$

where ζ is the potential across the Stern layer (zeta potential), E is the electric field strength, and η is the viscosity of the solvent.

Separation of components in CEC is based on interactions between the stationary phase and differential electrophoretic migration of solutes.

== Instrumentation ==
The components of a capillary electrochromatograph are a sample vial, source and destination vials, a packed capillary, electrodes, a high-voltage power supply, a detector, and a data output and handling device. The source vial, destination vial and capillary are filled with an electrolyte such as an aqueous buffer solution. The capillary is packed with stationary phase. To introduce the sample, the capillary inlet is placed into a vial containing the sample and then returned to the source vial (sample is introduced into the capillary via capillary action, pressure, or siphoning). The migration of the analytes is then initiated by an electric field that is applied between the source and destination vials and is supplied to the electrodes by the high-voltage power supply. The analytes separate as they migrate due to their electrophoretic mobility, and are detected near the outlet end of the capillary. The output of the detector is sent to a data output and handling device such as an integrator or computer. The data is then displayed as an electropherogram, which reports detector response as a function of time. Separated chemical compounds appear as peaks with different migration times in an electropherogram.

== Advantages ==
Avoiding the use of pressure to introduce the mobile phase into the column, results in a number of important advantages. Firstly, the pressure driven flow rate across a column depends directly on the square of the particle diameter and inversely on the length of the column. This restricts the length of the column and size of the particle, particle size is seldom less than 3 micrometer and the length of the column is restricted to 25 cm. Electrically driven flow rate is independent of length of column and size. A second advantage of using electroosmosis to pass the mobile phase into the column is the plug-like flow velocity profile of EOF, which reduces the solute dispersion in the column, increasing column efficiency.

== See also ==
- Capillary electrophoresis
- Chromatography
- Electrochromatography
- Electrophoresis
- High-performance liquid chromatography
