= Jan van Deemter =

Dutch physicist (1918–2004)

Jan Jozef van Deemter
- Jan van Deemter
- Born: 31 March 1918
- Died: 10 October 2004 (aged 86)
- Education: University of Groningen; University of Amsterdam
- Known for: Van Deemter equation
- Scientific career
- Workplaces: Royal Dutch Shell
- Thesis: Theoretische en numerieke behandeling van ontwaterings- en infiltratie-stromings-problemen
- Doctoral advisor: Bartel Leendert van der Waerden

Jan Jozef van Deemter (31 March 1918 – 10 October 2004) was a Dutch physicist and engineer known for the Van Deemter equation in chromatography.

He obtained his doctorate in physics from the University of Amsterdam in June of 1950. Starting in 1947 he began work for Royal Dutch Shell as a researcher and it was there that he developed and published his article in 1956.

== Van Deemter equation ==
The van Deemter equation relates the resolving power of a chromatographic column to the various flow and kinetic parameters which cause peak broadening through

$$HETP = A + \frac{B}{u} + (C_s +C_m)\cdot u$$

Where HETP is the height equivalent theoretical plate, A is the eddy-diffusion parameter, B is the longitudinal diffusion coefficient of the eluting material in the longitudinal direction, C is the resistance to mass transfer coefficient of the analyte between mobile and stationary phase, and u is the linear velocity of the column flow.
