= Simulated moving bed =

In manufacturing, the simulated moving bed (SMB) process is a highly engineered process for implementing chromatographic separation. It is used to separate one chemical compound or one class of chemical compounds from one or more other chemical compounds to provide significant quantities of the purified or enriched material at a lower cost than could be obtained using simple (batch) chromatography. It cannot provide any separation or purification that cannot be done by a simple column purification. The process is rather complicated. The single advantage which it brings to a chromatographic purification is that it allows the production of large quantities of highly purified material at a dramatically reduced cost. The cost reductions come about as a result of: the use of a smaller amount of chromatographic separation media stationary phase, a continuous and high rate of production, and decreased solvent and energy requirements. This improved economic performance is brought about by a valve-and-column arrangement that is used to lengthen the stationary phase indefinitely and allow very high solute loadings to the process.

In the conventional moving bed technique of production chromatography the feed entry and the analyte recovery are simultaneous and continuous, but because of practical difficulties with a continuously moving bed, the simulated moving bed technique was proposed. In the simulated moving bed technique instead of moving the bed, the feed inlet, the solvent or eluent inlet and the desired product exit and undesired product exit positions are moved continuously, giving the impression of a moving bed, with continuous flow of solid particles and continuous flow of liquid in the opposite direction of the solid particles.

== Construction ==
Specifically, an SMB system has two or more identical columns, which are connected to the mobile phase pump, and each other, by a multi-port valve. The plumbing is configured in such a way that:

a) all columns will be connected in series, forming a single continuous loop;

b) typically, between each column there will be provisions for four process streams: incoming feed mixture, exiting purified fast component, exiting purified slow component, and incoming solvent or eluent;

and

c) each process stream (two inlets and two outlets) will proceed in the same direction after a set time (the steptime).

== Advantages ==
SMB provides lower production cost by requiring less column volume, less chromatographic separation media ("packing" or "stationary phase"), using less solvent and less energy, and requiring far less labor.

At industrial scale an SMB chromatographic separator is operated continuously, requiring less resin and less solvent than batch chromatography. The continuous operation facilitates operation control and integration into production plants.

== Drawbacks ==
The drawbacks of the SMB are higher investment cost compared to single column operations, a higher complexity, as well as higher maintenance costs. But these drawbacks are effectively compensated by the better yield and a much lower solvent consumption as well as a much higher productivity compared to simple batch separations.

For purifications, in particular the isolation of an intermediate single component or a fraction out of a multicomponent mixture, the SMB is not as ideally suited. Normally, a single SMB will separate only two fractions from each other, but a series or "train" of SMBs can perform multiple cuts and purify one or more products from a multi-component mixture. SMB is not readily suited for solvent gradients. Solvent gradient purification may be preferred for the purification of some biomolecules. A continuous chromatography technique to overcome the two fraction limit and to apply gradients is multicolumn countercurrent solvent gradient purification (MCSGP).

== Applications ==
In size exclusion chromatography, where the separation process is driven by entropy, it is not possible to increase the resolution attained by a column via temperature or solvent gradients. Consequently, these separations often require SMB, to extend usable retention time differences between the molecules or particles being separated. SMB is also very useful in the pharmaceutical industry, where separation of molecules having different chirality must be done on a very large scale. For the purification of fructose, e.g. in high fructose corn syrup, or amino-acids, biological-acids, etc. on an industrial scale, simulated moving bed chromatography is used in order to improve the economics of the production.

== See also ==
- Chromatography
- Multicolumn countercurrent solvent gradient purification
