= Alírio Rodrigues =

Portuguese chemical engineer

Alírio Rodrigues is a Portuguese chemical engineer. He is emeritus Professor of Chemical Engineering at Universidade do Porto and Director of the Laboratory of Separation and Reaction Engineering.

His research interests are in the fields of chemical engineering, bioengineering and materials engineering. He is the author of over 600 articles on catalysis and reaction engineering, a number of books, and of six patents. He is among the most cited chemical engineers according to the Shanghai Academic Ranking of World Universities He is on the Editorial Board of Chemical Engineering Journal. The press has been interested in his research on perfumed clothing.

== Rodrigues equation ==
The Rodrigues equation is an extension of the Van Deemter equation used to describe the efficiency of a bed of permeable (large-pore) particles.

The equation is:

$HETP = A + \frac{B}{u} + C \cdot f( \lambda ) \cdot u$

where HETP is the height equivalent theoretical plate

$$f( \lambda ) = \frac{3}{ \lambda } \left [ \frac{1}{\tanh( \lambda )} - \frac{1}{ \lambda } \right ]$$

and $\lambda$ is the intraparticular Péclet number.

=== Awards and honours ===
In 2008 he was awarded with Viviana Silva the Sustainability Award of the Institution of Chemical Engineers (IChemE).

Rodrigues has been awarded the 2019 medal for excellence in I+D+i of the Spanish association of chemists and chemical engineers as "recognition of an extraordinary research career in the area of separation processes and chemical reaction".

== Bibliography ==
- Perfume Engineering: Design, Performance and Classification, (2013) Butterworth-Heinemann; ISBN 978-0080993997
- Simulated Moving Bed Technology, (2015) Butterworth-Heinemann ISBN 9780128020241
