= Kovats retention index =

Index in gas chromatography

In gas chromatography, the Kovats retention index (shorter Kovats index, retention index; plural retention indices) is used to convert retention times into system-independent constants. The index is named after the Hungarian-born Swiss chemist Ervin Kováts (1927–2012), who outlined the concept in the 1950s while performing research into the composition of the essential oils.

The retention index of a chemical compound is retention time interpolated between adjacent n-alkanes. While retention times vary with the individual chromatographic system (e.g. with regard to column length, film thickness, diameter and inlet pressure), the derived retention indices are quite independent of these parameters and allow comparing values measured by different analytical laboratories under varying conditions and analysis times from seconds to hours. Tables of retention indices are used to identify peaks by comparing measured retention indices with the tabulated values.

== Isothermal Kovats retention index ==
The Kovats index applies to organic compounds. The method interpolates peaks between bracketing n-alkanes. The Kovats index of n-alkanes is 100 times their carbon number, e.g. the Kovats index of n-butane is 400. The Kovats index is dimensionless, unlike retention time or retention volume. For isothermal gas chromatography, the Kovats index is given by the equation:

$$I_i = 100 \left [ n + \frac{log (t_i-t_0) - log (t_n - t_0)}{log (t_{n+1} - t_0)-log (t_n - t_0)} \right ],$$

where the variables used are:

- $I_i$, the Kováts retention index of peak i
- $n$, the carbon number of n-alkane peak heading peak i
- $t_i$, the retention time of compound i, minutes
- $t_0$, the air peak, void time in average velocity $u=L/t_0$, minutes

The Kovats index also applies to packed columns with an equivalent equation:

$$I_i = 100 \left [ n + \frac{log (V_i^0) - log (V_n^0)}{log (V_{n+1}^0)-log (V_n^0)} \right ]$$

== Kovats index and physical properties ==
Compounds elute in the carrier gas phase only. Compounds solved in the stationary phase stay put. The ratio of gas time $t_0$ and residence time $t_i-t_0$ in the stationary liquid polymer phase is called the capacity factor $k_i$:

$$k_i=\frac{t_i-t_0}{t_0}=\frac {R T S_i} {P^i} \beta$$

Properties involved are:

- $R$ gas constant 8.314 [J/mole/k]
- $T$ temperature [k]
- $S_i$ solubility of compound i in polymer stationary phase [mole/m^{3}]
- $P^i$ vapor pressure of pure liquid i [Pa]

Wall Coated Open Capillary Tube column phase ratio β is:

$$\beta=\frac{V_L}{V_G}=\frac {4d_f} {d_c-2d_f}$$

Assuming uniform WCOT coating thickness $d_f$ and 100% coating efficiency. Coating thickness $d_f$ reduces by bleed trimerisation and pentamerisation that occur on column heating. Contrary to $d_f$, $d_c$ is well defined by the production process. The chromatographic capacity factor $k_i$ can be made explicit for retention time:

$$t_i= t_0 (\frac{RTS_i}{P^i}\frac {4d_f} {d_c} + 1)$$

So wear of the WCOT column reduces $d_f$ over column life time resulting in shorter retention time $t_i$ which is related to column length $L$ by average gas velocity $u=L/t_0$:

$$t_i=\frac L u (\frac{RTS_i}{P^i}\frac {4d_f} {d_c} + 1)$$

Temperature $T$ rise would result in more $t_i$ which is not true. Thanks to pure liquid vapor pressure $P^i$ rising exponentially with $T$, warmer columns $T$↑ do have shorter $t_i$. Solubility $S_i$ of compounds in the stationary phase may rise or fall with $T$, however not exponentially. At any case better solubility means longer retention $t_i$. $S_i$ is referred to as selectivity or polarity in gas chromatography. The physical relations in the Kovats index are:

$$I_i = 100 \left [ n +\frac{log(S_i/P^i)-log(S_n/P^n)}{log(S_{n+1}/P^{n+1})-log(S_n/P^n)} \right ]$$

Isothermal Kovats index is independent of $R$, any GC dimension $L$ or ß or carrier gas velocity $u$, which compares favorable to $t_i$ and packed and WCOT columns produce (nearly) the same Kovats index values. Isothermal Kovats index is based on solubility $S_i$ and vapor pressure $P^i$ of compound i and n-Alkanes ($i=n$). $T$ dependence depends on the compound relative to the n-alkanes. Kovats index of n-alkanes $I_n = 100c$ is independent of $T$. A huge number if isothermal Kovats indices of hydrocarbon were measured by Axel Lubeck and Donald Sutton.

== Temperature-programmed Kovats index ==
IUPAC defines the temperature programmed chromatography Kovats index equation:

$$I_i = 100 \left [ n + \frac{t_i - t_n}{ t_{n+1} - t_n } \right ]$$

- $t_n$ & $t_{n+1}$ retention times of trailing and heading n-alkanes, respectively.

NOTE: TPGC index does depend on temperature program, gas velocity and the column used !

ASTM method D6730 defines the temperature programmed chromatography Kovats index equation:

$$I_i = 100 \left [ n + \frac{\log (t_i/t_n)}{\log (t_{n+1}/t_n)} \right]$$

Measured Kovats retention index values can be found in ASTM method D 6730 databases. An extensive Kovats index database is compiled by NIST .

The equations produce significant different Kovats indices.

== Method translation ==
Faster GC methods have shorter times but Kovats indices of the compounds may be conserved if proper method translation is applied. Temperatures of the temperature program stay the same, but ramps and times change when using a smaller column or faster carrier gas. If column dimensions Length×diameter×film are divided by 2 and gas velocity is doubled by using H2 in place of Helium, the hold times must be divided by 4 and the ramps must be multiplied by 4 to keep the same index and the same retention temperature for the same compound analyzed. Method translation rules are incorporated in some chromatography data systems.
