= Csaba Horváth (chemical engineer) =

Hungarian-American chemical engineer (1930–2004)

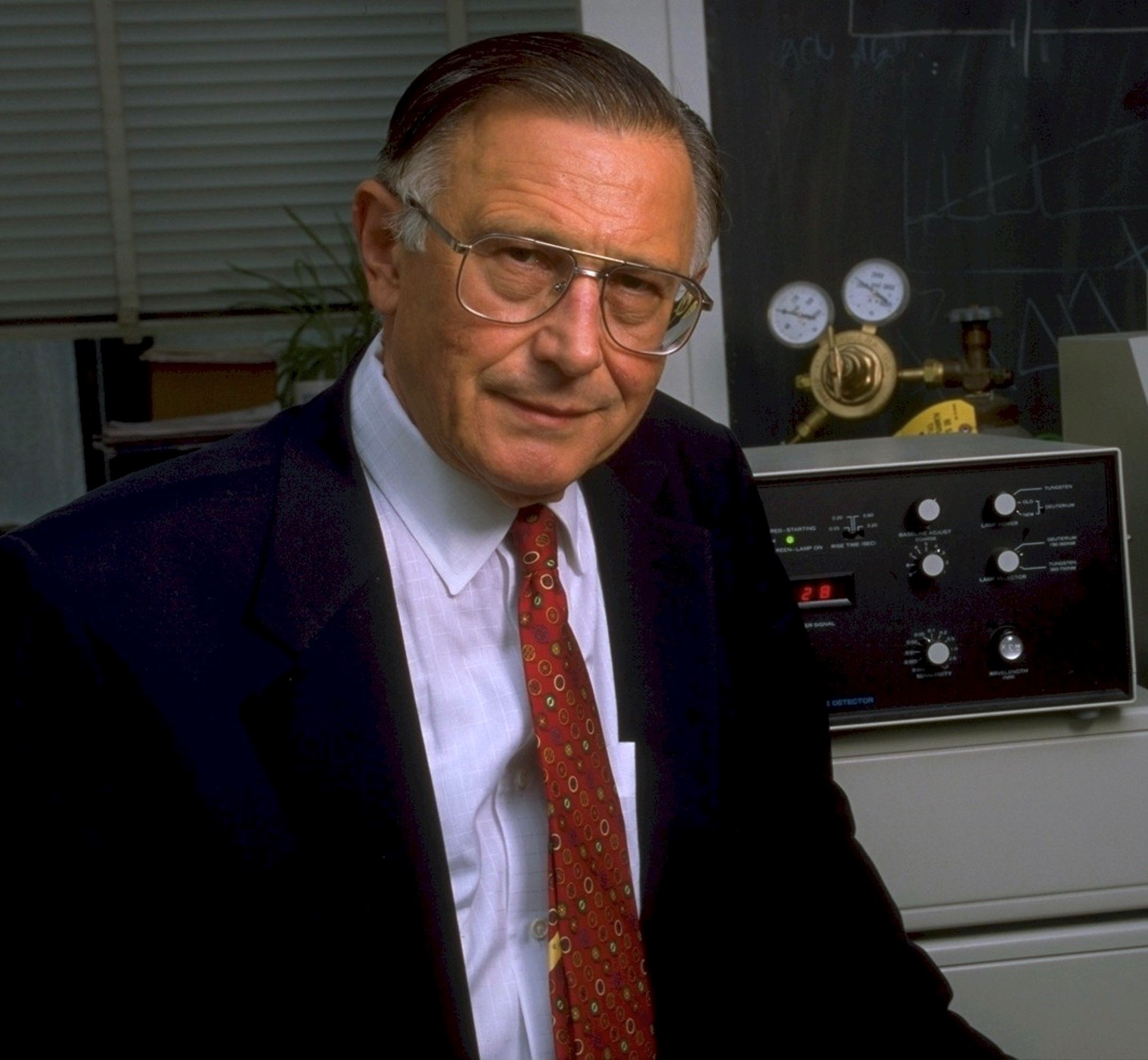
- Horvath at Yale's Mason Lab in the late 80s
- Born: 25 January 1930; Szolnok, Hungary
- Died: 13 April 2004 (aged 74); New Haven, Connecticut, U.S.
- Known for: High-performance liquid chromatography
- Scientific career
- Institutions: Yale University

Csaba Horváth (25 January 1930 – 13 April 2004) was a Hungarian-American chemical engineer, particularly noted for building the first high-performance liquid chromatograph.

== Early life and education ==
Csaba Horváth was born in Szolnok, Hungary and graduated in chemical engineering from the Budapest Institute of Technology. In 1956 he went to West Germany to work for Hoechst AG. He then studied physical chemistry at the J.W. Goethe University in Frankfurt, receiving his Ph.D. in 1963.

== Career ==
In 1964 he joined Yale School of Medicine. From 1967 he also had an appointment in the Faculty of Engineering. In 1972 he joined the Department of Chemical Engineering at Yale, becoming full Professor in 1979 and chair of the department from 1987 to 1993. He was named as Roberto Goizueta Professor of Chemical Engineering in 1998. He died on 13 April 2004, at Yale-New Haven Hospital of a stroke.

Professor Horvath had an abiding interest in the advancement of the careers of young scientists, and has been memorialized by the establishment of the Csaba Horvath Young Scientist Award for the best presentation by a scientist under the age of 35 at the International Symposium on High Performance Liquid Separations and Related Techniques (HPLC) meeting. The award is sponsored by HPLC, Inc.

=== Work ===
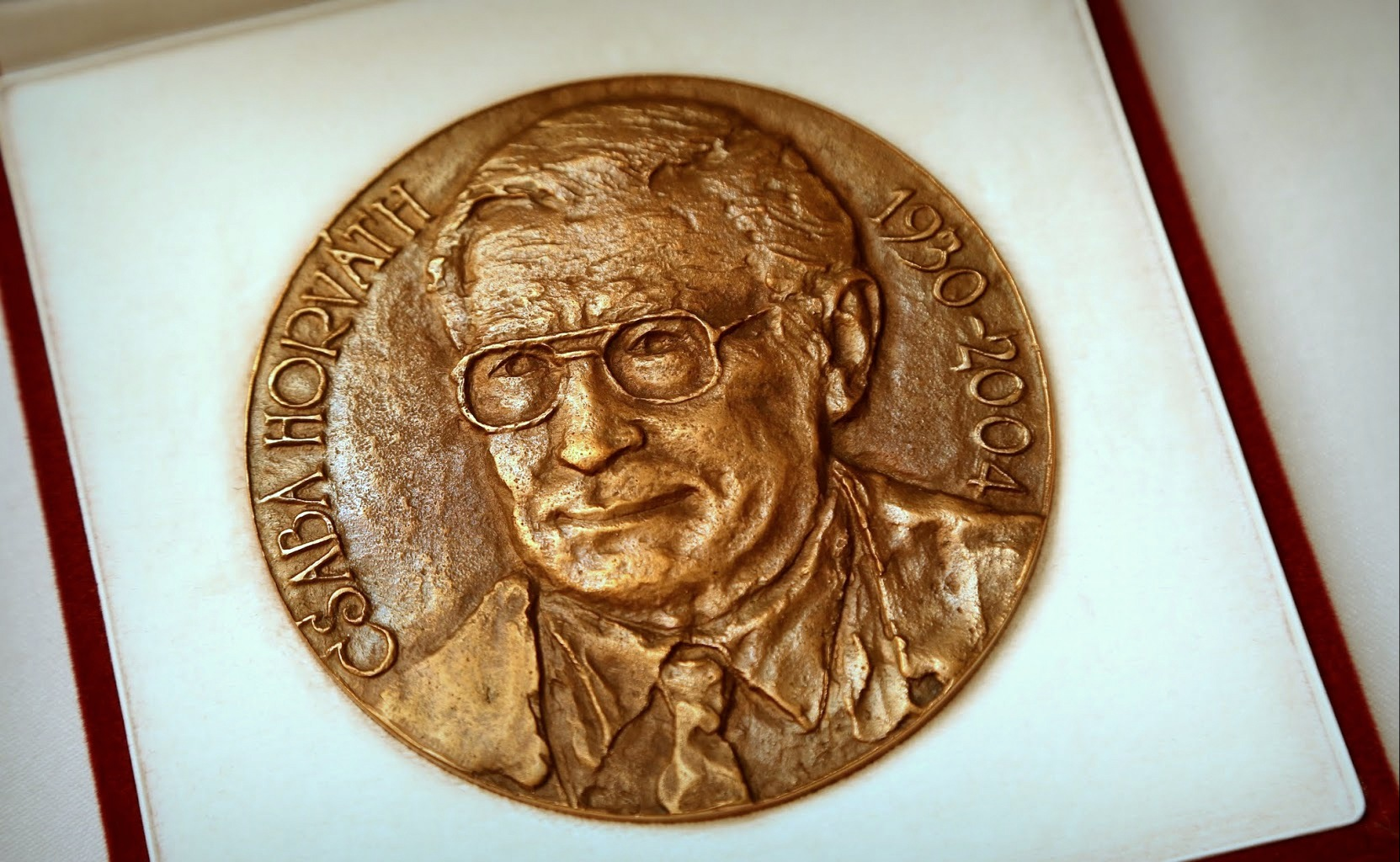
Csaba Horváth Memorial Award

Having worked in industry in the pilot plant of Farbwerke Hoechst AG and then on the surface chemistry of organic pigments, he studied for a PhD at Goethe University in gas-liquid chromatography, a method of separating volatile materials for chemical analysis. He applied his knowledge of chemical engineering science to improving the technology, and developed support-coated open tubular (SCOT) columns which were widely used until supplanted by further developments in capillary columns. He continued to be involved in developments in gas-liquid chromatography in his later career.

However, it was while at Harvard Medical School and Yale School of Medicine that he appreciated the need for analytical separation of biological compounds which could not be vaporized, and this led to the application of his particular understanding of separation processes to vastly improve the performance of liquid chromatography. Thus was created high performance liquid chromatography or HPLC, a technique which became a major field of study (and in which he remained a leading figure), and continued to publish till shortly before his death.

Together with Imre Molnar and Wayne Melander he developed the framework for describing retention mechanisms in reversed phase chromatography (RPLC), employing the framework of the solvophobic theory. As HPLC and RPLC became the preeminent techniques associated with biochemical analysis, many have suggested that Csaba Horvath inexplicably missed inclusion in the ranks of Nobel laureates. He worked on other methods of analytical separation of biological materials, notably electrophoresis and displacement chromatography, but also was influential in developing biochemical engineering within the Chemical Engineering Department at Yale.

He published about 300 papers and held 9 patents. He was a member of the United States National Academy of Engineering. He received many other honors and awards and is remembered in the Horváth Laboratory of Separation Science at Innsbruck.

== Personal life ==
In 1963, Horváth married Valeria Scioscioli in Rome, and they emigrated to the United States. He joined the Physics Research Laboratory at Harvard Medical School. The couple had two daughters.

== Sources ==
- L. S. Ettre (2004) American Laboratory, May 2004, pages 4-6 In memoriam: Csaba Horváth
- A. Guttman (2000) American Laboratory, June 2000, pages 6-10 Happy Birthday Csaba Horváth
- The Hungary Page Nobel Prize Winners and Famous Hungarians: Science, Mathematics & Technology
- "Speeches at his remembrance Service". Archived from the original on June 18, 2004.
- Claudia Flavell-White The Chemical Engineer October 2010 pp 54–55 "Degrees of Separation: Chemical Engineers who Changed the World - Csaba Horváth"
- An Introduction to Separation Science, (1973) B.L. Karger, Cs. Horváth and L.R. Snyder, Wiley
