= Displacement chromatography =

Displacement chromatography is a chromatography technique in which a sample is placed onto the head of the column (Note: For simplicity, this article is written using the terminology of column liquid chromatography. Examples of other types of displacement chromatography are known.) and is then displaced by a solute that is more strongly sorbed than the components of the original mixture. The result is that the components are resolved into consecutive "rectangular" zones of highly concentrated pure substances rather than solvent-separated "peaks". It is primarily a preparative technique; higher product concentration, higher purity, and increased throughput may be obtained compared to other modes of chromatography.

== Discovery ==
The advent of displacement chromatography can be attributed to Arne Tiselius, who in 1943 first classified the modes of chromatography as frontal, elution, and displacement. Displacement chromatography found a variety of applications including isolation of transuranic elements and biochemical entities. The technique was redeveloped by Csaba Horváth, who employed modern high-pressure columns and equipment. It has since found many applications, particularly in the realm of biological macromolecule purification.

== Principle ==
Example of a Langmuir isotherm, for a population of binding sites having uniform affinity. In this case the vertical axis represents the amount bound per unit of stationary phase, the horizontal axis the concentration in the mobile phase. In this case, the dissociation constant is 0.5 and the capacity 10; units are arbitrary.

The basic principle of displacement chromatography is: there are only a finite number of binding sites for solutes on the matrix (the stationary phase), and if a site is occupied by one molecule, it is unavailable to others. As in any chromatography, equilibrium is established between molecules of a given kind bound to the matrix and those of the same kind free in solution. Because the number of binding sites is finite, when the concentration of molecules free in solution is large relative to the dissociation constant for the sites, those sites will mostly be filled. This results in a downward-curvature in the plot of bound vs free solute, in the simplest case giving a Langmuir isotherm. (Note: In some forms of chromatography, including gel permeation chromatography and some liquid-liquid partition systems, distinct binding sites are not involved and the isotherm remains essentially linear even at high concentrations. These forms are not suitable for displacement-mode operation.) A molecule with a high affinity for the matrix (the displacer) will compete more effectively for binding sites, leaving the mobile phase enriched in the lower-affinity solute. Flow of mobile phase through the column preferentially carries off the lower-affinity solute and thus at high concentration the higher-affinity solute will eventually displace all molecules with lesser affinities.

== Mode of operation ==
=== Loading ===
At the beginning of the run, a mixture of solutes to be separated is applied to the column, under conditions selected to promote high retention. (Note: It is possible to set the retention too high; the rate of desorption must be appreciable for displacement to occur.) The higher-affinity solutes are preferentially retained near the head of the column, with the lower-affinity solutes moving farther downstream. The fastest moving component begins to form a pure zone downstream. The other components also begin to form zones, but the continued supply of the mixed feed at head of the column prevents full resolution.

=== Displacement ===
After the entire sample is loaded, the feed is switched to the displacer, chosen to have higher affinity than any sample component. (Note: Sometimes a short rinse is interposed before starting the displacer.) The displacer forms a sharp-edged zone at the head of the column, pushing the other components downstream. Each sample component now acts as a displacer for the lower-affinity solutes, and the solutes sort themselves out into a series of contiguous bands (a "displacement train"), all moving downstream at the rate set by the displacer. The size and loading of the column are chosen to let this sorting process reach completion before the components reach the bottom of the column. The solutes appear at the bottom of the column as a series of contiguous zones, each consisting of one purified component, with the concentration within each individual zone effectively uniform.

=== Regeneration ===
After the last solute has been eluted, it is necessary to strip the displacer from the column. Since the displacer was chosen for high affinity, this can pose a challenge. On reverse-phase materials, a wash with a high percentage of organic solvent may suffice. Large pH shifts are also often employed. One effective strategy is to remove the displacer by chemical reaction; for instance if hydrogen ion was used as displacer it can be removed by reaction with hydroxide, or a polyvalent metal ion can be removed by reaction with a chelating agent. For some matrices, reactive groups on the stationary phase can be titrated to temporarily eliminate the binding sites, for instance weak-acid ion exchangers or chelating resins can be converted to the protonated form. For gel-type ion exchangers, selectivity reversal at very high ionic strength can also provide a solution. Sometimes the displacer is specifically designed with a titratable functional group to shift its affinity. After the displacer is washed out, the column is washed as needed to restore it to its initial state for the next run.

== Comparison with elution chromatography ==
=== Common fundamentals ===
In any form of chromatography, the rate at which the solute moves down the column is a direct reflection of the percentage of time the solute spends in the mobile phase. To achieve separation in either elution or displacement chromatography, there must be appreciable differences in the affinity of the respective solutes for the stationary phase. Both methods rely on movement down the column to amplify the effect of small differences in distribution between the two phases. Distribution between the mobile and stationary phases is described by the binding isotherm, a plot of solute bound to (or partitioned into) the stationary phase as a function of concentration in the mobile phase. The isotherm is often linear, or approximately so, at low concentrations, but commonly curves (concave-downward) at higher concentrations as the stationary phase becomes saturated.

=== Characteristics of elution mode ===
In elution mode, solutes are applied to the column as narrow bands and, at low concentration, move down the column as approximately Gaussian peaks. These peaks continue to broaden as they travel, in proportion to the square root of the distance traveled. For two substances to be resolved, they must migrate down the column at sufficiently different rates to overcome the effects of band spreading. Operating at high concentration, where the isotherm is curved, is disadvantageous in elution chromatography because the rate of travel then depends on concentration, causing the peaks to spread and distort.

Retention in elution chromatography is usually controlled by adjusting the composition of the mobile phase (in terms of solvent composition, pH, ionic strength, and so forth) according to the type of stationary phase employed and the particular solutes to be separated. The mobile phase components generally have lower affinity for the stationary phase than do the solutes being separated, but are present at higher concentration and achieve their effects due to mass action. Resolution in elution chromatography is generally better when peaks are strongly retained, but conditions that give good resolution of early peaks lead to long run-times and excessive broadening of later peaks unless gradient elution is employed. Gradient equipment adds complexity and expense, particularly at large scale.

=== Advantages and disadvantages of displacement mode ===
In contrast to elution chromatography, solutes separated in displacement mode form sharp-edged zones rather than spreading peaks. Zone boundaries in displacement chromatography are self-sharpening: if a molecule for some reason gets ahead of its band, it enters a zone in which it is more strongly retained, and will then run more slowly until its zone catches up. Furthermore, because displacement chromatography takes advantage of the non-linearity of the isotherms, loadings are deliberately high; more material can be separated on a given column, in a given time, with the purified components recovered at significantly higher concentrations. Retention conditions can still be adjusted, but the displacer controls the migration rate of the solutes. The displacer is selected to have higher affinity for the stationary phase than does any of the solutes being separated, and its concentration is set to approach saturation of the stationary phase and to give the desired migration rate of the concentration wave. High-retention conditions can be employed without gradient operation, because the displacer ensures removal of all solutes of interest in the designed run time.

Because of the concentrating effect of loading the column under high-retention conditions, displacement chromatography is well suited to purify components from dilute feed streams. However, it is also possible to concentrate material from a dilute stream at the head of a chromatographic column and then switch conditions to elute the adsorbed material in conventional isocratic or gradient modes. Therefore, this approach is not unique to displacement chromatography, although the higher loading capacity and less dilution allow greater concentration in displacement mode.

A disadvantage of displacement chromatography is that non-idealities always give rise to an overlap zone between each pair of components; this mixed zone must be collected separately for recycle or discard to preserve the purity of the separated materials. The strategy of adding spacer molecules to form zones between the components (sometimes termed "carrier displacement chromatography") has been investigated and can be useful when suitable, readily removable spacers are found. Another disadvantage is that the raw chromatogram, for instance a plot of absorbance or refractive index vs elution volume, can be difficult to interpret for contiguous zones, especially if the displacement train is not fully developed. Documentation and troubleshooting may require additional chemical analysis to establish the distribution of a given component. Another disadvantage is that the time required for regeneration limits throughput.

According to John C. Ford's article in the Encyclopedia of Chromatography, theoretical studies indicate that at least for some systems, optimized overloaded elution chromatography offers higher throughput than displacement chromatography, though limited experimental tests suggest that displacement chromatography is superior (at least before consideration of regeneration time).

== Applications ==
Historically, displacement chromatography was applied to preparative separations of amino acids and rare earth elements and has also been investigated for isotope separation.

=== Proteins ===
The chromatographic purification of proteins from complex mixtures can be quite challenging, particularly when the mixtures contain similarly retained proteins or when it is desired to enrich trace components in the feed. Further, column loading is often limited when high resolutions are required using traditional modes of chromatography (e.g. linear gradient, isocratic chromatography). In these cases, displacement chromatography is an efficient technique for the purification of proteins from complex mixtures at high column loadings in a variety of applications.

An important advance in the state of the art of displacement chromatography was the development of low molecular mass displacers for protein purification in ion exchange systems. This research was significant in that it represented a major departure from the conventional wisdom that large polyelectrolyte polymers are required to displace proteins in ion exchange systems.

Low molecular mass displacers have significant operational advantages as compared to large polyelectrolyte displacers. For example, if there is any overlap between the displacer and the protein of interest, these low molecular mass materials can be readily separated from the purified protein during post-displacement processing using standard size-based purification methods (e.g. size exclusion chromatography, ultrafiltration). In addition, the salt-dependent adsorption behavior of these low MW displacers greatly facilitates column regeneration. These displacers have been employed for a wide variety of high resolution separations in ion exchange systems. In addition, the utility of displacement chromatography for the purification of recombinant growth factors, antigenic vaccine proteins and antisense oligonucleotides has also been demonstrated. There are several examples in which displacement chromatography has been applied to the purification of proteins using ion exchange, hydrophobic interaction, as well as reversed-phase chromatography.

Displacement chromatography is well suited for obtaining mg quantities of purified proteins from complex mixtures using standard analytical chromatography columns at the bench scale. It is also particularly well suited for enriching trace components in the feed. Displacement chromatography can be readily carried out using a variety of resin systems including, ion exchange, HIC and RPLC.

=== Two-dimensional chromatography ===
Two-dimensional chromatography represents the most thorough and rigorous approach to evaluation of the proteome. While previously accepted approaches have utilized elution mode chromatographic approaches such as cation exchange to reversed phase HPLC, yields are typically very low requiring analytical sensitivities in the picomolar to femtomolar range. As displacement chromatography offers the advantage of concentration of trace components, two dimensional chromatography utilizing displacement rather than elution mode in the upstream chromatography step represents a potentially powerful tool for analysis of trace components, modifications, and identification of minor expressed components of the proteome.
