= Multicolumn countercurrent solvent gradient purification =

Form of chromatography

Multicolumn countercurrent solvent gradient purification (MCSGP) is a form of chromatography that is used to separate or purify biomolecules from complex mixtures. It was developed at the Swiss Federal Institute of Technology Zürich by Aumann and Morbidelli. The process consists of two to six chromatographic columns which are connected to one another in such a way that as the mixture moves through the columns the compound is purified into several fractions.

== Overview ==
The MCSGP process consists of several, at least two, chromatographic columns which are switched in position opposite to the flow direction. Most of the columns are equipped with a gradient pump to adjust the modifier concentration at the column inlet. Some columns are connected directly, so that non pure product streams are internally recycled. Other columns are short circuited, so that they operate in pure batch mode. The system is split into several sections, from which every section performs a tasks analogous to the tasks of a batch purification. These tasks are loading the feed, running the gradient elution, recycling of weakly adsorbing site fractions, fractionation of the purified product, recycling of strongly adsorbing site fractions, cleaning the column from strongly adsorbing impurities, cleaning in place and re-equilibration of the column to start the next purification run. All of the tasks mentioned here are carried out at the same time in one unit. Recycling of non-pure side fractions is performed in countercurrent movement.

== Comparison with other purification methods ==
Biomolecules are often purified via solvent gradient batch chromatography. Here smooth linear solvent gradients are applied to carefully handle the separation between the desired component and hundreds of impurities. The desired product is usually intermediate between weakly and strongly absorbing impurities. A center cut is required to get the desired pure product. Often the preparative resins have a low efficiency due to strong axial dispersion and slow mass transfer. Then a purification in one chromatographic step is not possible. Countercurrent movement as known from the SMB process would be required. For large scale productions and for very valuable molecules countercurrent solid movement need to be applied to increase the separation efficiency, the yield and the productivity of the purification. The MCSGP process combines both techniques in one process, the countercurrent SMB principle and the solvent gradient batch technique.

Discontinuous mode consists of equilibration, loading, washing, purification and regeneration steps. The discontinuous mode of operation allows exploiting the advantage of solvent gradients, but it implies high solvent consumptions and low productivities with respect to continuous countercurrent processes. An established process of this kind is the simulated moving bed technique (SMB) that requires the solvent-consuming steps of equilibration, washing, regeneration only once per operation and has a better resin utilization. However, major drawbacks of SMB are the inability of separating a mixture into three fractions and the lack of solvent gradient applicability. In the case of antibodies, the state-of-the-art technique is based on batch affinity chromatography (with Protein A or Protein G as ligands) which is able to selectively bind antibody molecules. In general, affinity techniques have the advantage of purifying biomolecules with high yields and purities but the disadvantages are in general the high stationary phase cost, ligand leaching and reduced cleanability.

The MCSGP process can result in purities and yields comparable to those of purification using Protein A. The second application example for the MCSGP prototype is the separation of three MAb variants using a preparative weak cation-exchange resin. Although the intermediately eluting MAb variant can only be obtained with 80% purity at recoveries close to zero in a batch chromatographic process, the MCSGP process can provide 90% purity at 93% yield. A numerical comparison of the MCSGP process with the batch chromatographic process, and a batch chromatographic process including ideal recycling, has been performed using an industrial polypeptide purification as the model system. It shows that the MCSGP process can increase the productivity by a factor of 10 and reduce the solvent requirement by 90%.

The main advantages with respect to solvent gradient batch chromatography are high yields also for difficult separations, less solvent consumption, higher productivity, usage of countercurrent solid movement, which increases the separation efficiency. The process is continuous. Once a steady state is reached, it delivers continuously purified product in constant quality and quantity. Automatic cleaning in place is integrated. A pure empirical design of the operating conditions from a single solvent gradient batch chromatogram is possible.

== Applications ==
All chromatographic purifications and separations which are executed via solvent gradient batch chromatography can be performed using MCSGP. Typical examples are reversed phase purification of peptides, hydrophobic interaction chromatography for fatty acids or for example ion exchange chromatography of proteins or antibodies. The process can effectively enrich components, which have been fed in only small amounts. Continuous capturing of antibodies without affinity chromatography can be realized with the MCSGP-process.
