= BIA Separations =

Coordinates: 45.883997°N 13.894940°E

- Company type: Private
- Industry: High-performance liquid chromatography, Biotechnology, Biochromatography
- Founded: Ljubljana, Slovenia (1998)
- Headquarters: Ajdovščina, Slovenia
- Area served: Worldwide
- Products: Monolithic HPLC columns
- Website: biaseparations.com

BIA Separations is a biotechnology company focused on the production of methacrylate monolithic HPLC columns and developing industrial purification processes and analytical methods.

== Company history ==
BIA Separations was formed in 1998 by a group of scientists in Ljubljana, Slovenia to commercialize a new chromatographic resin based on monolith technology. Monolithic resin was developed independently by three different laboratories in late 1980s led by Hjertén, Švec and Tennikova. The company was one of the few Slovenian companies to receive venture capital funding at that time-Horizonte Venture Management realizing the potential of monoliths made the initial investment in the company. During that year, BIA Separations released its first commercial product marketed under the trade name of CIM (Convective Interaction Media). The new technique was named HPMC (High Performance Monolith Chromatography). During the 1999 and 2000s, the company promoted this new platform technology to the scientific and business community and registered several patents. In 2007 the company headquarters moved to Villach, Austria. In 2011 BIA Separations entered a strategic partnership with Japan Synthetic Rubber Corporation, a Japanese company producing synthetic materials. A strategic partnership agreement with Showa Denko K.K. (SDK) was signed in 2012.

== Technology ==
CIM monoliths are made of porous methacrylate polymers composed of interconnected channels that range in size from 1-6 μm. It is these channels that account for the media separation power and flow characteristics and ability to purify large biomolecules, such as large proteins, immunoglobulins, plasmid DNA and viruses with their activity intact. Components to be separated are conveyed to the active groups located on the surface of the channels by bulk flow of the mobile phase. Since the channels are interconnected, there is no diffusion, no dead end pores, no void volume and no stagnant zones to slow down the transport between the stationary and mobile phase. Consequently, monolithic columns have flow independent resolution and binding capacity. They exhibit low back pressure, even at very high flow rates. In this way, the purification time can be significantly decreased, resulting in a pronounced reduction of the purification process costs.

== Applications ==
Depending on the column size, CIM monolithic columns are primarily used for the purification or analysis of large biomolecules which are being used for cancer gene therapy, treatment of viral infectious diseases and treatment of genetic diseases. Some types of molecules that can be successfully purified using CIM columns are pDNA, IgM, inter-alpha inhibitors, virus like particles, and diverse viruses; adenoviruses, bacteriophages, feline calicivirus, hepatitis A, lentivirus, influenza A and B, rabies virus, rotavirus, tomato and pepino mosaic virus.

== The Monolith Summer School ==
Since 2004, BIA Separations has organized and hosted the Monolith Summer School and Symposium (MSS) which takes place every 2 years. MSS was established as there were no dedicated conferences to this technology and to bring together the top international scientists and researchers in the area of monolith chromatography to share their experiences and innovative applications.
