= Lucasta Miller =

British journalist

Lucasta Frances Elizabeth Miller FRSL (born 5 June 1966) is an English writer and literary journalist.

== Education ==
Miller was educated at Westminster School and Lady Margaret Hall, Oxford, at which she attained a congratulatory first in English in 1988. She was awarded a PhD at the University of East Anglia in 2007.

== Career ==
Miller worked as deputy literary editor of The Independent in the mid-1990s. Known for her study in metabiography, The Bronte Myth (published by Jonathan Cape in the UK in 2001 and Knopf in the US in 2003), she has also been a contributor to the Guardian, as a profile and comment writer, a reviewer for the Times Literary Supplement and the Economist and was one of the judges of the Man Booker Prize in 2009. Miller wrote the preface for a Penguin Classics edition of Wuthering Heights in 2003. She has been a trustee of the London Library and the Wordsworth Trust and was the founding editorial director of Notting Hill Editions. In the academic year 2015-16 she was Beaufort visiting fellow at Lady Margaret Hall and a visiting scholar at Wolfson College, Oxford.

Miller's biography of Letitia Elizabeth Landon, L.E.L. The Lost Life and Scandalous Death of Letitia Landon, the Celebrated "Female Byron", was published by Knopf and Jonathan Cape in 2019: "Ms Miller ... analyzes with revelatory insight ... this infinitely rich literary biography".

Miller was elected a Fellow of the Royal Society of Literature (FRSL) in 2025.

== Personal life ==
In 1992 Miller married the tenor Ian Bostridge. They have two children and live in London.
