= Nicolaas Adrianus Rupke =

Dutch historian of science and biographer (born 1944)

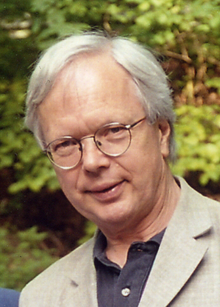
- Born: January 22, 1944 (age 82); Rotterdam, Netherlands
- Occupations: Historian of science and biographer

Academic background
- Education: University of Groningen; Princeton University; University of Oxford

Academic work
- Discipline: History of science
- Sub-discipline: Geology; Evolutionary thought; Science & religion
- Institutions: Göttingen University (1993–2012); Washington and Lee University (2012–)

Nicolaas Adrianus Rupke (born 22 January 1944 in Rotterdam) is a Dutch historian of science and biographer, who began his academic career as a marine geologist.

He studied biology and geology at the university of Groningen and geology and the history of science at Princeton and Oxford. Early in his studies, Rupke was a Christian and proponent of Flood geology, but later came to reject this position. When in 1977 he was elected to a Wolfson College, Oxford research position in the history of science, Rupke made this subject his full-time occupation. A series of similar international research posts followed, until in 1993 he took up a professorship at Göttingen University to teach the history of science and medicine. In 2009, Rupke was awarded a Lower Saxony research chair. In 2012, he took up an endowed professorship at Washington and Lee University in Lexington, Virginia, USA.

Rupke is known for his studies of late-modern biology, geology and science & religion. With an interest in the biographical approach, he restored to their contemporary prominence several nineteenth-century scientists, most important among them Richard Owen who well before the appearance of The Origin of Species developed a naturalistic theory of evolution, albeit a non-Darwinian one.

Studies of Alexander von Humboldt came next, in which Rupke developed what he terms the metabiographical approach by exploring how a famous life – in this case Humboldt's – may be multiply retold and reconstructed as part of different belief systems and memory cultures.

Rupke is a fellow of Germany's National Academy of Sciences Leopoldina and of the Göttingen Academy of Sciences.

== Selected books ==
- Distinctive Properties of Turbiditic and Hemipelagic Mud Layers (with Daniel J. Stanley). Washington, DC: Smithsonian Institution Press, 1974.
- The Great Chain of History: William Buckland and the English School of Geology (1814–1849). Oxford: Clarendon Press, 1983. ISBN 0198229070
- Vivisection in Historical Perspective (ed.). London, Croom Helm, 1987; Routledge, 1988. ISBN 0415050219
- Science, Politics and the Public Good (ed.). London: Macmillan, 1988.
- Medical Geography in Historical Perspective (ed.). London: Wellcome Trust Centre for the History of Medicine, 2000. ISBN 0854840729
- Richard Owen: Biology without Darwin (revised ed. of Richard Owen: Victorian Naturalist, New Haven and London: Yale, 1994, ISBN 978-0300058208) Chicago and London: University of Chicago Press, 2009.
- Alexander von Humboldt: A Metabiography (corrected edition). Chicago and London: University of Chicago Press, 2008. Rupke, Nicolaas A. (2005). 1st edition. Peter Lang. ISBN 3631539320.
- Eminent Lives in Twentieth-Century Science and Religion (ed.) (revised and much expanded edition). Frankurt a.M.: Lang, 2009. Rupke, Nicolaas A. (2007). 2007 edition. Peter Lang. ISBN 9783631568033.
- Albrecht von Haller im Göttingen der Aufklärung (ed. with Norbert Elsner). Göttingen: Wallstein, 2009.
