= Van Deemter equation =

Relation in chromatography

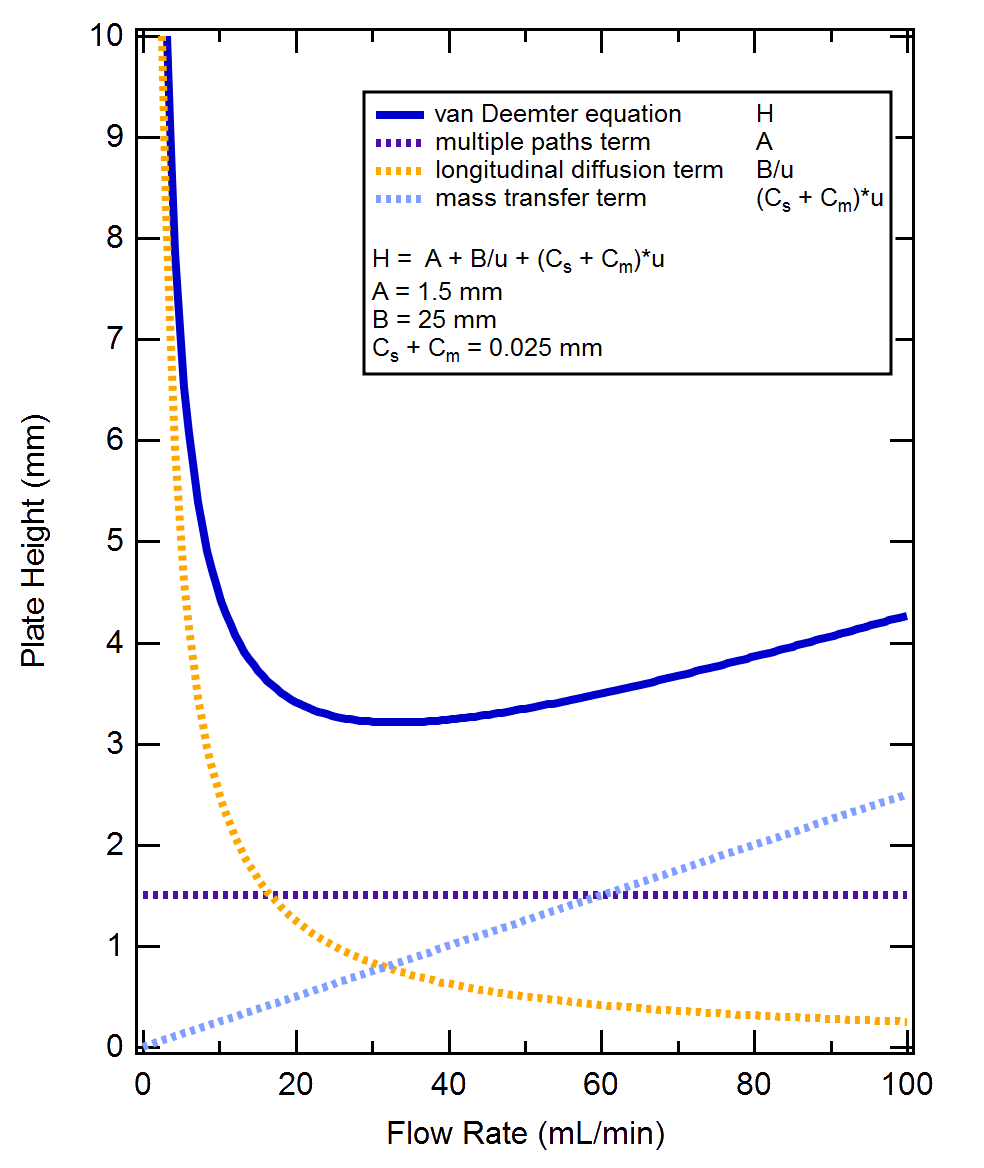

The van Deemter equation in chromatography, named for Jan van Deemter, relates the variance per unit length of a separation column to the linear mobile phase velocity by considering physical, kinetic, and thermodynamic properties of a separation. These properties include pathways within the column, diffusion (axial and longitudinal), and mass transfer kinetics between stationary and mobile phases. In liquid chromatography, the mobile phase velocity is taken as the exit velocity, that is, the ratio of the flow rate in ml/second to the cross-sectional area of the ‘column-exit flow path.’ For a packed column, the cross-sectional area of the column exit flow path is usually taken as 0.6 times the cross-sectional area of the column. Alternatively, the linear velocity can be taken as the ratio of the column length to the dead time. If the mobile phase is a gas, then the pressure correction must be applied. The variance per unit length of the column is taken as the ratio of the column length to the column efficiency in theoretical plates. The van Deemter equation is a hyperbolic function that predicts that there is an optimum velocity at which there will be the minimum variance per unit column length and, thence, a maximum efficiency. The van Deemter equation was the result of the first application of rate theory to the chromatography elution process.

== Van Deemter equation ==
The van Deemter equation relates height equivalent to a theoretical plate (HETP) of a chromatographic column to the various flow and kinetic parameters which cause peak broadening, as follows:

$$HETP = A + \frac{B}{u} + C\cdot u$$

Where

- HETP = a measure of the resolving power of the column [m]
- A = Eddy-diffusion parameter, related to channeling through a non-ideal packing [m]
- B = diffusion coefficient of the eluting particles in the longitudinal direction, resulting in dispersion [m^{2} s^{−1}]
- C = Resistance to mass transfer coefficient of the analyte between mobile and stationary phase [s]
- u = speed [m s^{−1}]

In open tubular capillaries, the A term will be zero as the lack of packing means channeling does not occur. In packed columns, however, multiple distinct routes ("channels") exist through the column packing, which results in band spreading. In the latter case, A will not be zero. The version of the Van Deemter equation that applies to capillary columns called the Golay equation which is as follows:

$$HETP = \frac{B}{u} + (C_s +C_m)\cdot u$$

The form of the Van Deemter equation is such that HETP achieves a minimum value at a particular flow velocity. At this flow rate, the resolving power of the column is maximized, although in practice, the elution time is likely to be impractical. Differentiating the van Deemter equation with respect to velocity, setting the resulting expression equal to zero, and solving for the optimum velocity yields the following:

$$u = \sqrt{\frac{B}{C}}$$

== Plate count ==
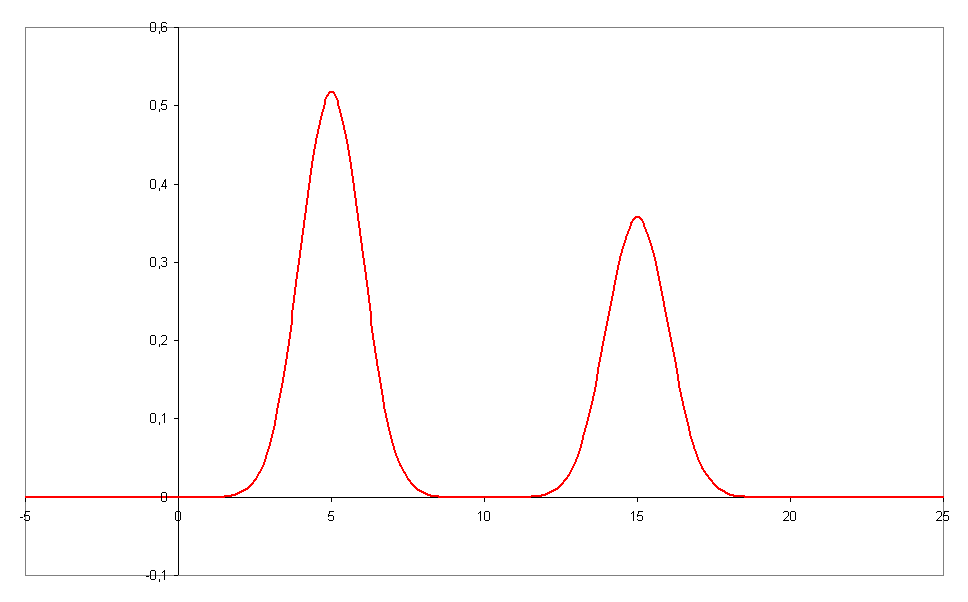
Two well resolved peaks in a chromatogram

The plate height given as:

$$H = \frac{L}{N} \,$$

with $L \,$ the column length and $N\,$ the number of theoretical plates can be estimated from a chromatogram by analysis of the retention time $t_R \,$ for each component and its standard deviation $\sigma \,$ as a measure for peak width, provided that the elution curve represents a Gaussian curve.

In this case the plate count is given by:

$$N = \left(\frac{t_R}{\sigma}\right)^2 \,$$

By using the more practical peak width at half height $W_{1/2} \,$ the equation is:

$$N = 8 \ln(2) \cdot \left(\frac{t_R}{W_{1/2}}\right)^2 \,$$

or with the width at the base of the peak:

$$N = 16 \cdot \left(\frac{t_R}{W_{base}}\right)^2 \,$$

== Expanded van Deemter Eq. ==
The Van Deemter equation can be further expanded to:

$$H = 2\lambda d_p + {2\gamma D_m \over u} + {\omega(d_p \mbox{ or } d_c)^2 u \over D_m}+{Rd_f^2 u \over D_s}$$

Where:

- H is plate height
- λ is particle shape (with regard to the packing)
- d_{p} is particle diameter
- γ, ω, and R are constants
- D_{m} is the diffusion coefficient of the mobile phase
- d_{c} is the capillary diameter
- d_{f} is the film thickness
- D_{s} is the diffusion coefficient of the stationary phase.
- u is the linear velocity

== Rodrigues equation ==
The Rodrigues equation, named for Alírio Rodrigues, is an extension of the Van Deemter equation used to describe the efficiency of a bed of permeable (large-pore) particles.

The equation is:

$HETP = A + \frac{B}{u} + C \cdot f( \lambda ) \cdot u$

where

$$f( \lambda ) = \frac{3}{ \lambda } \left [ \frac{1}{\tanh( \lambda )} - \frac{1}{ \lambda } \right ]$$

and $\lambda$ is the intraparticular Péclet number.

== See also ==
- Resolution (chromatography)
- Jan van Deemter
