= Electrochromatography =

Electrochromatography is a chemical separation technique in analytical chemistry, biochemistry and molecular biology used to resolve and separate mostly large biomolecules such as proteins. It is a combination of size exclusion chromatography (gel filtration chromatography) and gel electrophoresis. These separation mechanisms operate essentially in superposition along the length of a gel filtration column to which an axial electric field gradient has been added. The molecules are separated by size due to the gel filtration mechanism and by electrophoretic mobility due to the gel electrophoresis mechanism. Additionally there are secondary chromatographic solute retention mechanisms.

== Capillary electrochromatography ==
Capillary electrochromatography (CEC) is an electrochromatography technique in which the liquid mobile phase is driven through a capillary containing the chromatographic stationary phase by electroosmosis. It is a combination of high-performance liquid chromatography and capillary electrophoresis. The capillaries is packed with HPLC stationary phase and a high voltage is applied to achieve separation is achieved by electrophoretic migration of the analyte and differential partitioning in the stationary phase.

== See also ==
- Chromatography
- Protein electrophoresis
- Electrofocusing
- Two-dimensional gel electrophoresis
- Temperature gradient gel electrophoresis
