= Autobiogeography =

Autobiogeography is a self-referential map or other geographic document created by the subject. It is a convergence of autobiography and geography that indicates geolocation of personal experiences such as travel, personal migration or important experiences. The first use of autobiogeography documented online was in the Summer 2002 Reconstruction.org academic peer reviewed journal. The technique was popularized in 2005 by internet trends encouraging social mapping and personal mapping.

An autobiogeography can take many forms, from formal anthropological study to loose, intimate autobiogeographies found on social mapping websites. Unlike autobiographies, broad celebrity is less important than relevance to a small social circle or to oneself. For this reason, an interesting subject for an autobiogeography may be someone relatively unknown.
