= Resolution (chromatography) =

Measure of separation of two peaks

Example chromatogram showing signal as a function of retention time

In chromatography, resolution is a measure of the separation of two peaks of different retention time t in a chromatogram.

== Expression ==
Chromatographic peak resolution is given by

$$R_s = 2\cfrac{t_{R2}-t_{R1}}{w_{b1}+w_{b2}}$$

where t_{R} is the retention time and w_{b} is the peak width at baseline. The bigger the time-difference and/or the smaller the bandwidths, the better the resolution of the compounds. Here compound 1 elutes before compound 2.

If the peaks have the same width

$$R_s = \cfrac{t_{R2}-t_{R1}}{w_b}$$.

== Plate number ==
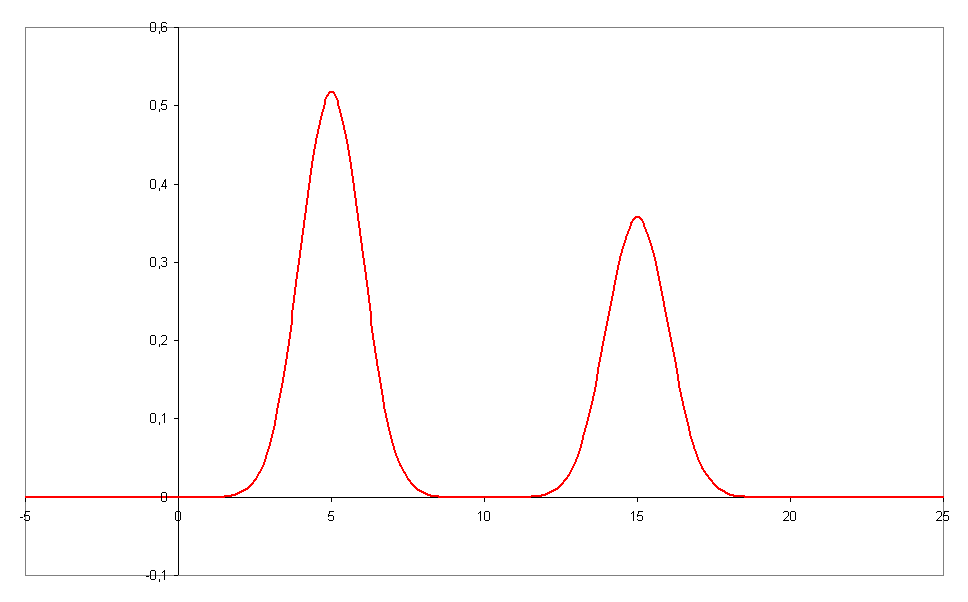
Two resolved peaks in a chromatogram

The theoretical plate height is given by

$$H = \frac{L}{N}$$

where L is the column length and N the number of theoretical plates. The relation between plate number and peak width at the base is given by

$$N = 16 \cdot \left(\frac{t_R}{W_b}\right)^2 \,$$.

== See also ==
- Image resolution
- Resolution (mass spectrometry)
- Van Deemter equation
