= Geomontography =

Printing method

Geomontography was a printing method, that consisted in the combination of embossing and of multiple color printing, and that was used primarily for the production of maps. The color layers were applied using lithographic techniques, and then the embossing was used to give relief to buildings, walls, mountains and other architectural and geographic features. Sometimes, the raised elements of the map were left unprinted, such as in Bauerkeller's 1846 map of Paris, while the rest of the picture was printed with vivid colors. The same method was sometimes used for the production of relief prints of buildings, plants, sculptures, landscape views or other graphic motives. Several of these maps were exhibited at the Industrial World Fair of Paris in 1839.

The technique was developed by the German printer Georg Michael Bauerkeller (1805 - 1886) and his half-brother Georg Leonhart Bauerkeller, who worked in Frankfurt am Main and in Karlsruhe before opening a printing and embossing office in Paris in the late 1930s. Georg Michael Bauerkeller deposited a patent application for his invention in France, in January the 18th, 1839. However, even if the manufacturing process was patented, the term geomontographie (geomontography) was not.

The process was adopted for the teaching of the blind, and maps embossed in that manner were employed at Paris' Institut des Jeunes Aveugles (Institute for the Blind Youth), that were offered to the children for them to finger-read. Laas d'Aguen, a supervisor of the institute, reinforced the printed maps by embossing additional layers of blank paper using the same platen, so the paper sheets would stick together creating a rigid cardboard material. This was done so to avoid deforming and damaging the paper under the blind readers finger pressure.
