= Metabiography =

Literary study of the relations between biographies and their writers

Metabiography is the literary study of the relation of biographies to the temporal, geographical, institutional, intellectual or ideological locations of their writers (the biographers). It is a hermeneutics of biography that sees the biographical subject (the “biographee”) as a collective construct of different memory cultures, proposing an essential instability of historical lives. In the words of Steven Shapin, metabiography stresses “that shifting biographical traditions make one person have many lives,” none of these necessarily more real than any other, because all are “configured and reconfigured according to the sensibilities and needs of the changing cultural settings.” In this sense, metabiography expresses a belief in the observer-dependence of historical knowledge.

== Metabiography vs. traditional biography ==
As part of the preparations for their own writings, biographers have traditionally examined previous biographical studies. For these authors, dealing with predecessors has served such purposes as establishing the factual inadequacy of earlier efforts, staking one’s own claim against prior “myths” and “mistakes,” or has been intended simply as laying the groundwork for a new and more “definitive” study. Metabiography, however, goes beyond writing about the strengths or weaknesses of preceding biographical studies in interpreting a life. It is less concerned with the authenticity of biographical representations than with their relational nature. Metabiography is thus similar to what Richard Holmes calls 'comparative biography', which analyses more than one biographical account of the same subject to reveal 'shifts and differences - factual, formal, stylistic, ideological, aesthetic'. It has been argued that in the history of science, metabiography has a long tradition of over fifty years, stretching from Henry Guerlac’s study of “Lavoisier and his biographers” to A. Rupert Hall’s edition of eighteenth-century Newton biographies and beyond. However, to these scholars, the study of former biographers had a propaedeutic function vis-à-vis the biographical works of their own time. They did not follow a relational approach and thus do not meet the crucial criterion for metabiographical studies. The metabiographer is less concerned with authenticating a narrative about the biographical subject, than with the wider questions of “textuality, memorialisation, life-course models, the uses of the past, and the narrative interpretation of its traces” that can be explored through detailed study of the palimpsest or over-layering of competing biographical accounts.

== Examples of metabiography in general history ==
In the field of biographies of artists and writers, the metabiographical approach was followed e.g. by David Dennis for Ludwig van Beethoven (1770–1827), and Lucasta Miller who used it to good effect in the case Emily Brontë (1818–48). Gordon S. Wood’s study on the Americanization of Benjamin Franklin, however, is not metabiography, although the Franklin literature would provide ideal material for such a study.

== Examples of metabiography in the field of scientific biography ==
Examples of scientific metabiography are Jan Sapp’s “The nine lives of Gregor Mendel,” Patricia Fara’s Newton: the Making of Genius and Nicolaas Rupke’s Alexander von Humboldt: a Metabiography. James Moore and Ralph Colp have applied the metabiographical approach to Charles Darwin. A metabiographical slant is also discernible in the Reader’s Guide to the History of Science (2000).
