= Anion-exchange chromatography =

Chromatography process

Anion exchange chromatography
- Acronym: HPAE
- Classification: Ion exchange chromatography Column chromatography

Other techniques
- Related: Chromatography; High performance liquid chromatography Aqueous normal phase chromatography Size exclusion chromatography Micellar liquid chromatography

Anion-exchange chromatography is a process that separates substances based on their charges using an ion-exchange resin containing positively charged groups, such as diethyl-aminoethyl groups (DEAE). In solution, the resin is coated with positively charged counter-ions (cations). Anion exchange resins will bind to negatively charged molecules, displacing the counter-ion. Anion exchange chromatography is commonly used to purify proteins, amino acids, sugars/carbohydrates and other acidic substances with a negative charge at higher pH levels. The tightness of the binding between the substance and the resin is based on the strength of the negative charge of the substance.

== General technique for protein purification ==
A slurry of resin, such as DEAE-Sephadex is poured into the column. The matrix that is used is insoluble with charged groups that are covalently attached. These charged groups are referred to as exchangers like cation and anion exchangers. After it settles, the column is pre-equilibrated in buffer before the protein mixture is applied. DEAE-Sephadex is a positively charged slurry that will have electrostatic interactions with the negatively charged atoms, making them elute later than the positively charged molecules in the interested sample. This is a separation technique used widely to discover specific proteins, or enzymes in the body. Unbound proteins are collected in the flow-through and/or in subsequent buffer washes. Proteins that bind to the positively charged resin are retained and can be eluted in one of two ways. First, the salt concentration in the elution buffer is gradually increased. The negative ions in the salt solution (e.g. Cl^{−}) compete with protein in binding to the resin. Second, the pH of the solution can be gradually decreased which results in a more positive charge on the protein, releasing it from the resin. Both of these techniques can displace the negatively charged protein which is then eluted into test tubes fractions with the buffer.

The separation of proteins will depend on the differences in total charge. Composition of ionizable side chain groups will determine the total charge of the protein at a particular pH. At the isoelectric point (pI), the total charge on the protein is 0 and it will not bind to the matrix. If the pH is above the pI, the protein will have a negative charge and bind to the matrix in an anion exchange column. The stability of the protein at values above or below the pI, will determine if an anion exchange column or cation exchange column should be used. If it is stable at pH values below the pI, the cation exchange column can be used. If it is stable at pH values above the pI then the anion exchange column can be used.
