= Downstream processing =

Recovery of biosynthetic products from natural sources

Downstream processing refers to the recovery and the purification of biosynthetic products, particularly pharmaceuticals, from natural sources such as animal tissue, plant tissue or fermentation broth, including the recycling of salvageable components as well as the proper treatment and disposal of waste. It is an essential step in the manufacture of pharmaceuticals such as antibiotics, hormones (e.g. insulin and human growth hormone), antibodies (e.g. infliximab and abciximab) and vaccines; antibodies and enzymes used in diagnostics; industrial enzymes; and natural fragrance and flavor compounds. Downstream processing is usually considered a specialized field in biochemical engineering, which is itself a specialization within chemical engineering. Many of the key technologies were developed by chemists and biologists for laboratory-scale separation of biological and synthetic products, whilst the role of biochemical and chemical engineers is to develop the technologies towards larger production capacities.

Downstream processing and analytical bioseparation both refer to the separation or purification of biological products, but at different scales of operation and for different purposes. Downstream processing implies manufacture of a purified product fit for a specific use, generally in marketable quantities, while analytical bioseparation refers to purification for the sole purpose of measuring a component or components of a mixture, and may deal with sample sizes as small as a single cell.

== Stages ==
A widely recognized heuristic for categorizing downstream processing operations divides them into four groups which are applied in order to bring a product from its natural state as a component of a tissue, cell or fermentation broth through progressive improvements in purity and concentration.

Removal of insolubles is the first step and involves the capture of the product as a solute in a particulate-free liquid, for example the separation of cells, cell debris or other particulate matter from fermentation broth containing an antibiotic. Typical operations to achieve this are filtration, centrifugation, sedimentation, precipitation, flocculation, electro-precipitation, and gravity settling. Additional operations such as grinding, homogenization, or leaching, required to recover products from solid sources such as plant and animal tissues, are usually included in this group.

Product isolation is the removal of those components whose properties vary considerably from that of the desired product. For most products, water is the chief impurity and isolation steps are designed to remove most of it, reducing the volume of material to be handled and concentrating the product. Solvent extraction, adsorption, ultrafiltration, and precipitation are some of the unit operations involved.

Product purification is done to separate those contaminants that resemble the product very closely in physical and chemical properties. Consequently, steps in this stage are expensive to carry out and require sensitive and sophisticated equipment. This stage contributes a significant fraction of the entire downstream processing expenditure. Examples of operations include affinity, size exclusion, reversed phase chromatography, ion-exchange chromatography, crystallization and fractional precipitation.

Product polishing describes the final processing steps which end with packaging of the product in a form that is stable, easily transportable and convenient. Crystallization, desiccation, lyophilization and spray drying are typical unit operations. Depending on the product and its intended use, polishing may also include operations to sterilize the product and remove or deactivate trace contaminants which might compromise product safety. Such operations might include the removal of viruses or depyrogenation.

A few product recovery methods may be considered to combine two or more stages. For example, expanded bed adsorption (Vennapusa et al. 2008) accomplishes removal of insolubles and product isolation in a single step. Affinity chromatography often isolates and purifies in a single step.

== See also ==
- Fermentation (biochemistry)
- Separation process
- Unit operation
- Validation (drug manufacture)
- Biorefinery
