= Expanded bed adsorption =

Expanded bed adsorption (EBA) is a preparative chromatographic technique which makes processing of viscous and particulate liquids possible.

== Principle ==
The protein binding principles in EBA are the same as in classical column chromatography and the common ion-exchange, hydrophobic interaction and affinity chromatography ligands can be used. After the adsorption step is complete, the fluidized bed is washed to flush out any remaining particulates. Elution of the adsorbed proteins was commonly performed with the eluent flow in the reverse direction; that is, as a conventional packed bed, in order to recover the adsorbed solutes in a smaller volume of eluent. However, a new generation of EBA columns has been developed, which maintain the bed in the expanded state during this phase, producing high-purity, high yields of e.g. MAbs [monoclonal antibodies] in even smaller volumes of eluent. Process duration at manufacturing scale has also been cut considerably (under 7 hours in some cases).

EBA may be considered to combine both the "Removal of Insolubles" and the "Isolation" steps of the 4-step downstream processing heuristic. The major limitations associated with EBA technology is biomass interactions and aggregations onto adsorbent during processing.

Where classical column chromatography uses a solid phase made by a packed bed, EBA uses particles in a fluidized state, ideally expanded by a factor of 2. Expanded bed adsorption is, however, different from fluidised bed chromatography in essentially two ways: one, the EBA resin contains particles of varying size and density which results in a gradient of particle size when expanded; and two, when the bed is in its expanded state, local loops are formed. Particles such as whole cells or cell debris, which would clog a packed bed column, readily pass through a fluidized bed. EBA can therefore be used on crude culture broths or slurries of broken cells, thereby bypassing initial clearing steps such as centrifugation and filtration, which is mandatory when packed beds are used. In older EBA column designs, the feed flow rate is kept low enough that the solid packing remains stratified and does not fluidize completely. Hence EBA can be modelled as frontal adsorption in a packed bed, rather than as a well-mixed, continuous-flow adsorber.
