= Chromatofocusing =

Chromatofocusing is a protein-separation technique that allows resolution of single proteins and other ampholytes from a complex mixture according to differences in their isoelectric point. Chromatofocusing uses ion exchange resins and is typically performed on fast protein liquid chromatography (FPLC) or similar equipment capable of producing continuous buffer gradients, though this is not a requirement. In contrast to typical ion exchange chromatography, where bound molecules are eluted from the resin by increasing the ionic strength of the buffer environment, chromatofocusing elutes bound species by altering the pH of the buffer. This changes the net surface charge of bound molecules, altering their avidity for the resin. As the changing pH of the buffer system traverses the pI of a given molecule, that molecule will elute from the resin as it will no longer possess a net surface charge (a requisite for molecular binding to ion exchange resins). Chromatofocusing is a powerful purification technique with respect to proteins as it can resolve very similar species differing by less than 0.05 pH units that may not separate well, or at all, using traditional ion exchange strategies. A major drawback to this technique is that some proteins will aggregate when they are present at relatively high concentrations and carry no net surface charge. This can cause blockage of the resin, which is highly problematic when using sealed columns of ion exchange resin on FPLC equipment, resulting in pressure buildup and possible equipment failure. Apparent aggregation issues can sometimes be overcome by limiting the sample concentration and use of buffer additives that deter aggregate formation.
