= Monocyte monolayer assay =

Laboratory test for clinically significant alloantibodies

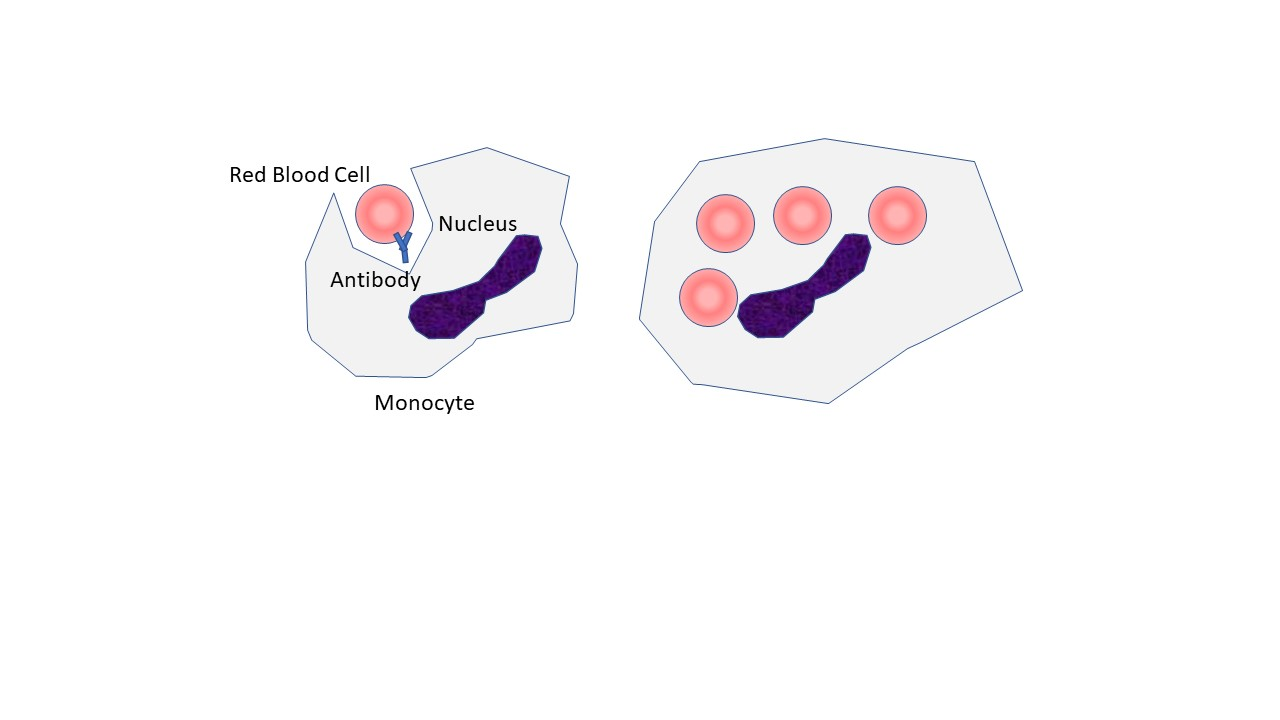
The image on the left shows a monocyte actively phagocytizing an antibody-sensitized red blood cell. The image on the right shows multiple RBC that have been phagocytized by a single monocyte.

The monocyte monolayer assay (MMA) is used to determine the clinical significance of alloantibodies produced by blood transfusion recipients. The assay is used to assess the potential for intravascular hemolysis when incompatible cellular blood products are transfused to the anemic patient. When donor cells possess substances that are not produced by the recipient, the recipient's immune system produces antibodies against the substance; these are called alloantibodies. Specific white blood cells, called monocytes, are tasked with ingesting foreign material and become activated during certain inflammatory events. These activated monocytes come in contact with antibody-sensitized red blood cells (RBC) and may or may not exhibit phagocytosis (ingestion) and destroy the donor red blood cells. If monocytes destroy the RBC, the antibody attached to those RBC is considered clinically significant.

== Background ==
=== Blood banking ===
Blood banking is a concentration within a clinical laboratory that analyzes specimens from potential transfusion recipients and provides compatible blood products to the healthcare team in charge of that patient's care. Several routine tests are performed including blood typing (determination of ABO/Rh status), antibody screening, serologic cross-matching, direct antiglobulin testing, and antibody identification. Beyond the presence of naturally occurring antibodies (isohemagglutinins) to the ABO and Rh(D) blood group antigens, additional immune-stimulated antibodies are considered unexpected alloantibodies.

The identification of unexpected antibodies is a labor-intensive process, and sometimes requires the addition of special laboratory techniques to aid in the proper identification of the antibody. Among these techniques are elutions, adsorptions, and enzyme treatment. Some patients produce antibodies to high frequency antigens. That is, the red cell antigens are present in a significant portion of the human population. It may be questionable and very difficult to assess if the antibody is considered clinically significant or not. A clinically significant antibody is an antibody that is capable of causing in vitro hemolysis or a decreased survival of transfused donor red blood cells. Antibodies to high frequency antigens can be assessed for clinical significance using the monocyte monolayer assay.

=== Hemolytic transfusion reaction ===
There are many different varieties of abnormal reactions to blood transfusion. Among these, a potentially life-threatening reaction is known as a hemolytic transfusion reaction. This is an immune mediated reaction where recipient antibodies attack donor red blood cell antigen(s), causing hemolysis of donor cells. The reaction may occur during, immediately after, or up to 28 days later. An acute reaction is observed within the first 24 hours, whereas a delayed reaction will be observed between 24 hours and 28 days after transfusion.

=== Alloantibody formation and clinical significance ===
When talking about the ABO blood group system, Landsteiner's Law states that if an individual possesses the A and/or B antigen, they will not form antibodies to these antigens. However, if an individual does not have either A or B antigens, they will naturally produce anti-A and anti-B antibodies. According to the International Society of Blood Transfusion (ISBT), 47 blood group systems containing hundreds of different red blood cell antigens have been described. With some exceptions, many non-ABO blood group system antigens require a sensitizing event to stimulate antibody production. In other words, the immune system must be exposed to the antigen in order to elicit antibody production. Exposure to antigens can occur through blood transfusion, stem cell/bone marrow transplant, and pregnancy.

The clinical significance of an alloantibody depends on its ability to cause a decrease in donor red blood cell survival. Characteristics of clinically significant alloantibodies include: immunoglobulin G antibody subclass, reactivity at body temperature, and ability to cause red blood cell agglutination in the presence of anti-human globulin (AHG) in an indirect antiglobulin test. Sometimes, clinical significance of an antibody can be difficult to determine. Antibodies to high prevalence red cell antigens can sometimes mask the detection of clinically significant alloantibodies because the corresponding antigen is present on most, if not all, of the screening red blood cells used to detect these antibodies possess the antigen. This is where the monocyte monolayer assay may be useful.

== Principle ==
The MMA is a very labor-intensive, manual laboratory testing method. The following steps are performed in this assay:

1. Anticoagulated blood is collected from normal, healthy individuals. Acid citrate dextrose is preferred.
2. Peripheral blood mononuclear cells (PBMC) are harvested from the blood sample using a Ficoll-Paque® density gradient.
3. The PBMC's are washed using a phosphate-buffered saline (PBS) and then suspended in tissue culture media in order to keep the monocytes viable.
4. The PBMC-media mixture is then added to a tissue culture chamber slide. Monocytes will adhere to the glass slide forming a monocyte monolayer.
5. Serum is mixed and incubated at body temperature (37°C) with a 5% group O RBC suspension. (This step sensitizes or coats RBC with antibody)
6. The sensitized RBC's are washed with PBS to remove any unbound antibody or interfering substances.
7. The washed, sensitized RBC are then added to the monocyte monolayer tissue culture chamber slide.
8. After a 60-minute, 37°C incubation, the supernatant is removed from the chamber slides and rinsed with PBS.
9. Once the slide is completely dry, it is stained with a Wrights-Giemsa stain.
10. At least 600 (200 if positivity is greater than 20%) monocytes are observed under the microscope for evidence of RBC phagocytosis.
11. A positive and negative control is also performed in tandem with the patient specimen for quality assurance.

== Interpretation ==
If the positive or negative controls fail, than the entire testing procedure is invalid and must be repeated. Criteria for a positive MMA will vary by laboratory, though the originally established threshold set by Sandra Nance et al., is >20% phagocytic activity observed.

Clinically, a positive MMA would indicate that the patient's serum used in the assay contains clinically significant antibodies that are capable of causing antibody-mediated phagocytosis.

== See also ==
- Acute hemolytic transfusion reaction
- Antibody opsonization
- Alloantibodies
