= Diethylaminoethyl cellulose =

Resin used in ion-exchange chromatography

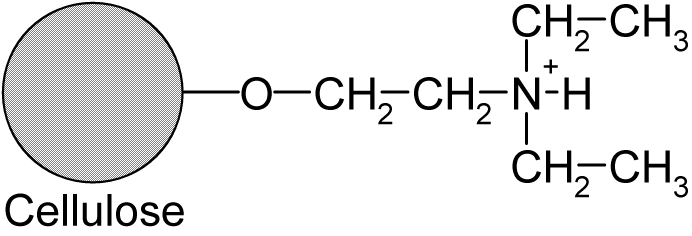
Schematic structure of DEAE-C: positively charged diethylaminoethanol groups can bind negative ions

Diethylaminoethyl cellulose (DEAE-C) is a positively charged resin used in ion-exchange chromatography, a type of column chromatography, for the separation and purification of proteins and nucleic acids. Gel matrix beads are derivatized with diethylaminoethanol (DEAE) and lock negatively charged proteins or nucleic acids into the matrix. The proteins are released from the resin by increasing the salt concentration of the solvent or changing the pH of the solution as to change the charge on the protein.

== Preparation ==
DEAE-C is synthesized by an alkali-catalyzed reaction of cellulose (obtained from cotton fabric) with 2-chlorotriethylamine, illustrated as following :

== Types ==
=== Common resins ===
DEAE-C is commonly commercially available as DE52 and DE53. These resins are prepared preswollen although cellulose exchangers swell in a strong basic environment to increase access to binding sites.

DE52 has a pKa of 11.5. The buffering range for diethanolamine is 8.4-8.8, though the range for DEAE-C varies between manufacturers.

=== DEAE-D ===
DEAE-Dextran (DEAE-D) is a positively charged dextran derivative that can be used for vaccine production, gene therapy, protein stabilization, dyslipidemia prevention, flocculating agents, and many other applications. DEAE-D is also used for transfecting animal cells with foreign DNA. It is added to solution containing DNA meant for transfection. It binds and interacts with negatively charged DNA molecules and via an unknown mechanism brings about the uptake of nucleic acids by the cell. This procedure is highly suited for transient transfection used for various molecular biology studies.

=== Other derivatives ===
DEAE-Sepharose, DEAE-650 and DEAE-Sephadex are commonly used in chromatography.

== Ion-exchange chromatography ==
DEAE-C is a weak anion exchanger. This exchange is utilized to separate proteins that have faintly differing charges. Like all anion exchangers, the resin carries a positive charge that interacts favorably with negative charges. The positive charge of DEAE cellulose is due to a protonated amine group. To ensure that the resin is protonated and positively charged, the chromatography should be performed at least 2 pH units below the pKa of the amine group, 10. The strength of the bond between the resin and protein is highly dependent on the pH range in the column and the pI of the protein of interest. The resin is a weak exchanger because it is only partially ionized over most pH values, and an efficient separation with DEAE-C chromatography requires a specific, narrow pH range.

Cellulose, dextran, agarose, and other insoluble complexes are unaffected because they compose inert matrices, hence why they are so often derivatized with strong and weak cation and anion exchangers in chromatography. DEAE-C beads have diethylaminoethyl chains covalently bound to oxygen atoms on the D-glucose subunits of cellulose.

== See also ==
- Size-exclusion chromatography
- Stationary phase
