= Antibody elution =

Laboratory procedure

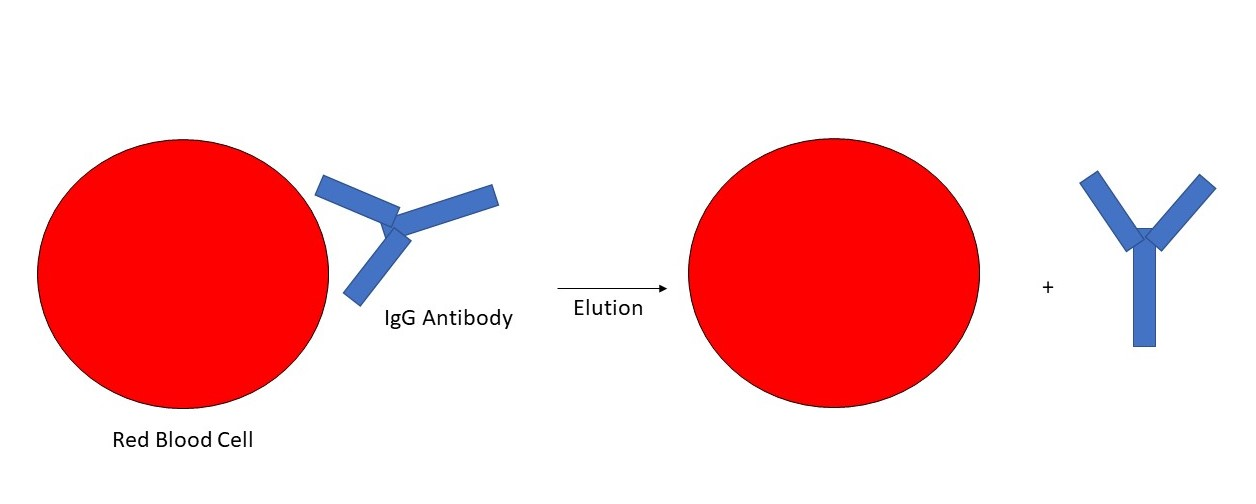
An antibody elution removes bound antibody from the surface of a red blood cell to aid in the antibody identification process.

An antibody elution is a clinical laboratory diagnostic procedure which removes sensitized antibodies from red blood cells, in order to determine the blood group system antigen the antibody targets. An antibody elution is deemed necessary when antibodies of the immunoglobulin class G (IgG) are found sensitized (bound) to peripheral red cells collected from a blood product transfusion recipient. IgG antibodies are detected using an assay known as the direct antiglobulin test.

Antibody elutions are specialized tests used in clinical blood banks. Examples of routine tests include ABO/Rh, antibody screen, antibody identification, and antiglobulin testing. Examples of other specialized tests used in blood banking include: treatment with thiol reagent, monocyte monolayer assay, enzyme treatment, and adsorptions.

This procedure aids in the investigation of antibodies that are difficult to identify, distinguishing transfusion reactions, hemolytic disease of the fetus and newborn, and warm autoantibody workups.

== Background ==
=== Blood group systems ===
Red blood cell membranes consist of a phospholipid bilayer, littered with proteins, lipids, carbohydrates, and combinations of these substances. These substances are called antigens because they stimulate an immune response when an individual is exposed to the substance, but the exposed individual does not carry nor express the genes which encode said antigens. Each individual has a unique genetic and phenotypic makeup of antigens, much like the dermatoglyphics of human fingerprints.

As of 2023, there are 44 blood group systems, each containing several red blood cell antigens totaling 354, determined by approximately 49 separate genes. Of these antigens, only a handful are considered clinically significant, meaning that they can stimulate the production of antibodies capable of causing red cell hemolysis. This is particularly important for the transfusion of packed red blood cells and other cellular blood products. Examples of blood group systems that contain antigens capable of inducing clinically significant alloantibodies (antibodies against non-self antigens) include, but are not limited to the ABO, Rh, Kell, Duffy, Kidd, and MNS blood group systems.

=== Antibody identification ===
Antibodies to blood group system antigens and their characteristics must be identified when such antibodies are detected in a potential recipient's serum or plasma. The specificity of the antibody aids the medical laboratory scientist in determining if the antibody is clinically significant. Antibody identification is a very laborious process.

Characteristics of clinically significant antibodies include: reactive at body temperature (37°C), immunoglobulin (Ig) class G, IgM that reacts at body temperature, ability to cross the placenta, ability to cause red blood cell destruction, and/or antibodies directed against commonly known clinically significant red cell antigens. For example, if an individual is exposed to a red cell antigen (via blood transfusion, pregnancy, stem-cell transplant) that they do not inherently possess, they may form a clinically significant antibody directed against that antigen. If a patient receives a transfusion of packed red blood cells possessing the Kell antigen (big K or simply K), they may form an antibody called anti-K (anti big K). Subsequent transfusions with K-positive packed red blood cells would cause an immediate hemolytic transfusion reaction. The K antibody reacts at 37°C, is IgG, capable of crossing the placenta, and known to cause immediate red blood cell destruction.

The presence of autoantibodies directed against self red blood cell antigens can complicate the antibody identification process. Red blood cell autoantibodies tend to be specific for red cell antigens of high frequency within the population. An antibody elution can aid in the identification of clinically significant alloantibodies when autoantibodies interfere with the antibody identification process.

== Methods of antibody elution ==
There are several methods of antibody elution used in clinical blood banking. Some of these methods include manipulating temperature, manipulating pH, use of organic solvents, and chloroquine. Each of these methods have advantages and disadvantages, and the method of elution will vary depending on clinical utility. One of the more commonly used methods is an acid elution, because it is quick, cheap, and relatively easy to perform.

=== Acid elution principle ===
The main steps involved in an acid elution include:

1. Separate and thoroughly wash red blood cells from a peripherally collected EDTA blood collection tube using centrifugation.
2. Mix washed patient red blood cells, that are positive for the IgG phase of the direct antiglobulin test, with glycine acid (pH 3.0).
3. Centrifuge the mixture, and immediately remove the supernatant from the destroyed red blood cells.
4. Add buffer to return the mixture to a neutral pH. This step is critical for further antibody identification testing, because the antibody will not react at a pH of less than 7.0.
5. Additional centrifugation may be needed to clarify the solution.
6. The resulting solution is known as the eluate. This eluate is then tested against a panel of red blood cells with known antigen profiles. This antibody identification procedure will aid in determining the specificity of the antibody.

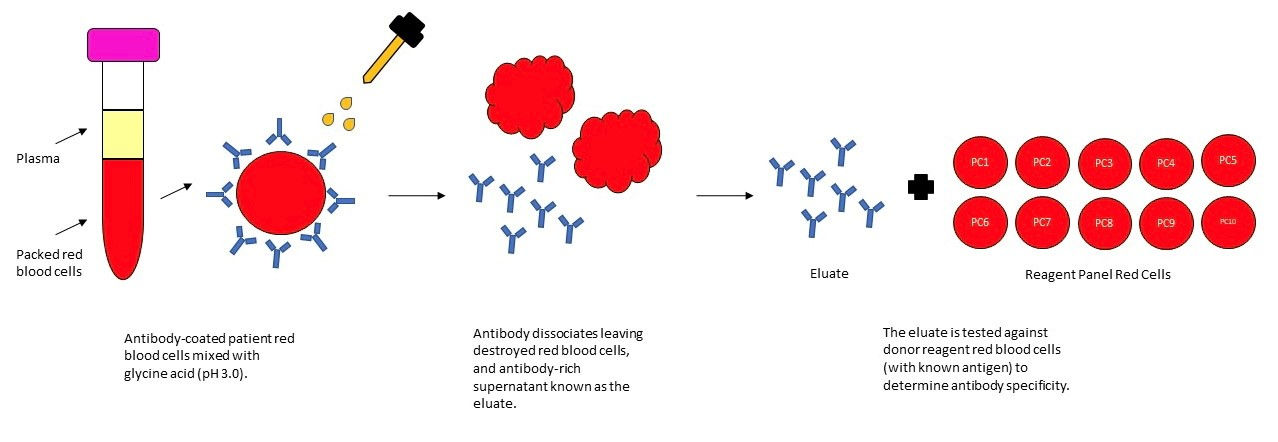
This infographic shows the acid antibody elution principle.

== Determining when to perform an antibody elution ==
=== Antiglobulin testing ===
The main method of antibody and antigen detection used in a clinical laboratory is red blood cell agglutination. Most IgM antibodies are easier to detect because they are larger and react at room temperature (20°C). This concept is what makes ABO/Rh testing so quick and easy to perform. However, most clinically significant non-ABO antibodies react at body temperature (37°C) and will not result in agglutination without the addition of multiple steps: incubation, washing, and the addition of anti-human globulin (AHG) reagent.

Anti-human globulin is an antibody directed against human IgG antibodies. When the smaller IgG antibody is attached to red blood cells, the larger AHG antibodies create a cross-link between IgG sensitized RBC forming visual agglutination. When this agglutination is observed, the antiglobulin test is considered positive for the detection of the antibody and/or antigen(s) present.

There are two main types of antiglobulin testing: indirect and direct. Indirect antiglobulin testing is used to detect antibodies in plasma/serum, whereas direct antiglobulin testing is used to detect antibody bound to red blood cells. When the direct antiglobulin test is positive, we must perform an antibody elution to remove the antibody for identification and to determine the antibody's clinical significance.

== See also ==
- Acute hemolytic transfusion reaction
- Alloantibodies
- Autoantibodies
- Elution
