= HPAE =

HPAE may stand for:

- High Performing Asian Economies
- High Performance Anion Exchange Chromatography
- Health Professionals and Allied Employees, a health care labor union.
