= Electroelution =

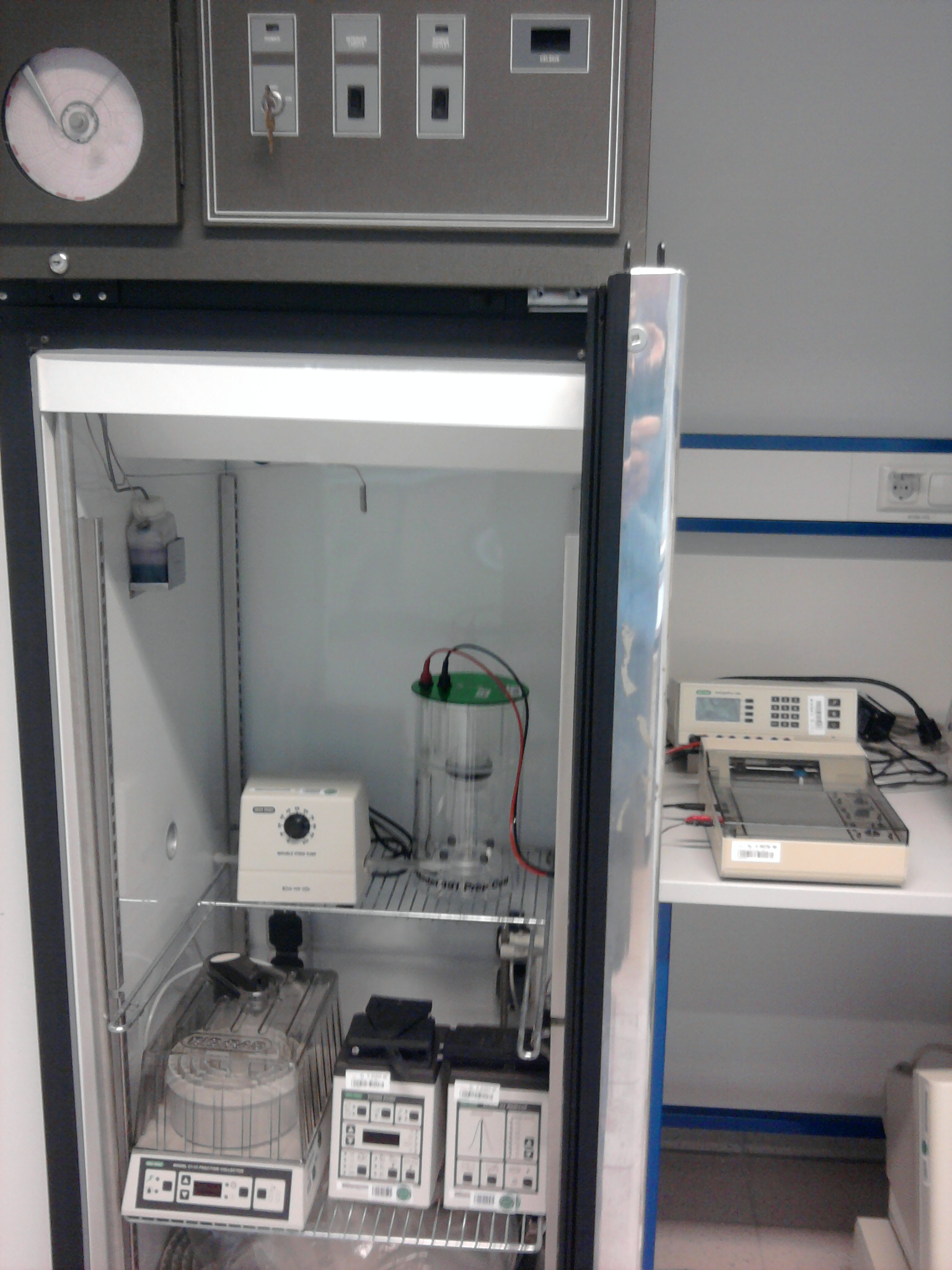
Specialized equipment for bioanalytical continuous-elution GE: electrophoresis chamber, peristaltic pump, fraction collector, buffer recirculation pump and UV detector (in the refrigerator), power supply and recorder (on the table).

Electroelution is a method used to extract a nucleic acid or a protein sample from an electrophoresis gel by applying a negative current in the plane of the smallest dimension of the gel, drawing the macromolecule to the surface for extraction and subsequent analysis. For example, electroblotting is based upon the same principle.

== DNA extraction ==
Using this method, DNA fragments can be recovered from a particular region of agarose or polyacrylamide gels. The gel piece containing the fragment is excised (cut out from the whole gel) and placed in a dialysis bag with buffer. Electrophoresis causes the DNA to migrate out of the gel into the dialysis bag buffer. The DNA fragments are recovered from this buffer and purified, using phenol–chloroform extraction followed by ethanol precipitation. This method is simple, rapid and yields high recovery (75%) of DNA fragments from gel pieces.

== Protein extraction ==
Preparative native PAGE yields more than 95% recovery of metalloproteins. Proteins are continuously eluted from a gel column and separated in different fractions according to their isoelectric points.
