= Micellar liquid chromatography =

Form of chromatography

- Acronym: MLC
- Classification: Chromatography

Other techniques
- Related: High performance liquid chromatography Aqueous normal phase chromatography Size exclusion chromatography Ion exchange chromatography

Micellar liquid chromatography (MLC) is a form of reversed phase liquid chromatography that uses an aqueous micellar solutions as the mobile phase.

== Theory ==
The use of micelles in high performance liquid chromatography was first introduced by Armstrong and Henry in 1980. The technique is used mainly to enhance retention and selectivity of various solutes that would otherwise be inseparable or poorly resolved. Micellar liquid chromatography (MLC) has been used in a variety of applications including separation of mixtures of charged and neutral solutes, direct injection of serum and other physiological fluids, analysis of pharmaceutical compounds, separation of enantiomers, analysis of inorganic organometallics, and a host of others.

One of the main drawbacks of the technique is the reduced efficiency that is caused by the micelles. Despite the sometimes poor efficiency, MLC is a better choice than ion-exchange LC or ion-pairing LC for separation of charged molecules and mixtures of charged and neutral species. Some of the aspects which will be discussed are the theoretical aspects of MLC, the use of models in predicting retentive characteristics of MLC, the effect of micelles on efficiency and selectivity, and general applications of MLC.

Reverse phase high-performance liquid chromatography (RP-HPLC) involves a non-polar stationary phase, often a hydrocarbon chain, and a polar mobile or liquid phase. The mobile phase generally consists of an aqueous portion with an organic addition, such as methanol or acetonitrile. When a solution of analytes is injected into the system, the components begin to partition out of the mobile phase and interact with the stationary phase. Each component interacts with the stationary phase in a different manner depending upon its polarity and hydrophobicity. In reverse phase HPLC, the solute with the greatest polarity will interact less with the stationary phase and spend more time in the mobile phase. As the polarity of the components decreases, the time spent in the column increases. Thus, a separation of components is achieved based on polarity. The addition of micelles to the mobile phase introduces a third phase into which the solutes may partition.

== Micelles ==
Micelles are composed of surfactant, or detergent, monomers with a hydrophobic moiety, or tail, on one end, and a hydrophilic moiety, or head group, on the other. The polar head group may be anionic, cationic, zwitterionic, or non-ionic. When the concentration of a surfactant in solution reaches its critical micelle concentration (CMC), it forms micelles which are aggregates of the monomers. The CMC is different for each surfactant, as is the number of monomers which make up the micelle, termed the aggregation number (AN). Table 1 lists some common detergents used to form micelles along with their CMC and AN where available.

Table 1
Type	Name	CMC (mM)	AN
Anionic	Cholic acid, sodium salt	14	2-4
Anionic	Deoxycholic acid, sodium salt	5	4-10
Anionic	Glycocholic acid, sodium salt	13	2
Anionic	Sodium dodecyl sulfate (SDS)	8.27	62
Anionic	Taurocholic acid, sodium salt	10-15	4
Anionic	Sodium tetradecyl sulfate	2.1	
Cationic	Cetyltrimethylammonium chloride	1	
Cationic	Cetyltrimethylammonium bromide (CTAB)	1.3	78
Cationic	Dodecyltrimethlyammonium bromide (DTAB)	14	50
Cationic	Hexadecyltrimethylammonium bromide	0.026	169
Zwitterionic	3-[(3-cholamidopropyl)dimethylammonio]-1-propanesulfonate (CHAPS)	8	10
Zwitterionic	3-[(3-cholamidopropyl)dimethylammonio]-2-hydroxy-1-propanesulfonate (CHAPSO)	8	11
Zwitterionic	N-Dodecyl-N,N-dimethylammonio-3-propane sulfonate	3.3	
Nonionic	n-Decyl-b-D-glucopyranoside	2.2	
Nonionic	Triton X-100	0.24	140
Nonionic	Polyoxyethylene (23) dodecanol (BRIJ 35)	0.1	
Nonionic	Polyoxyethylene [20]-sorbitane monooleate (Tween 80)	0.01	
Nonionic	Polyoxyethylene [20]-sorbitane monolaurate (Tween 20)	0.059	

Many of the characteristics of micelles differ from those of bulk solvents. For example, the micelles are, by nature, spatially heterogeneous with a hydrocarbon, nearly anhydrous core and a highly solvated, polar head group. They have a high surface-to-volume ratio due to their small size and generally spherical shape. Their surrounding environment (pH, ionic strength, buffer ion, presence of a co-solvent, and temperature) has an influence on their size, shape, critical micelle concentration, aggregation number and other properties.

Another important property of micelles is the Krafft point, the temperature at which the solubility of the surfactant is equal to its CMC. For HPLC applications involving micelles, it is best to choose a surfactant with a low Krafft point and CMC. A high CMC would require a high concentration of surfactant which would increase the viscosity of the mobile phase, an undesirable condition. Additionally, a Krafft point should be well below room temperature to avoid having to apply heat to the mobile phase. To avoid potential interference with absorption detectors, a surfactant should also have a small molar absorptivity at the chosen wavelength of analysis. Light scattering should not be a concern due to the small size, a few nanometers, of the micelle.

The effect of organic additives on micellar properties is another important consideration. A small amount of organic solvent is often added to the mobile phase to help improve efficiency and to improve separations of compounds. Care needs to be taken when determining how much organic to add. Too high a concentration of the organic may cause the micelle to disperse, as it relies on hydrophobic effects for its formation. The maximum concentration of organic depends on the organic solvent itself, and on the micelle. This information is generally not known precisely, but a generally accepted practice is to keep the volume percentage of organic below 15–20%.

== Research ==
Fischer and Jandera studied the effect of changing the concentration of methanol on CMC values for three commonly used surfactants. Two cationic, hexadecyltrimethylammonium bromide (CTAB), and N-(a-carbethoxypentadecyl) trimethylammonium bromide (Septonex), and one anionic surfactant, sodium dodecyl sulphate (SDS) were chosen for the experiment. Generally speaking, the CMC increased as the concentration of methanol increased. It was then concluded that the distribution of the surfactant between the bulk mobile phase and the micellar phase shifts toward the bulk as the methanol concentration increases. For CTAB, the rise in CMC is greatest from 0–10% methanol, and is nearly constant from 10–20%. Above 20% methanol, the micelles disaggregate and do not exist. For SDS, the CMC values remain unaffected below 10% methanol, but begin to increase as the methanol concentration is further increased. Disaggregation occurs above 30% methanol. Finally, for Septonex, only a slight increase in CMC is observed up to 20%, with disaggregation occurring above 25%.

As has been asserted, the mobile phase in MLC consists of micelles in an aqueous solvent, usually with a small amount of organic modifier added to complete the mobile phase. A typical reverse phase alkyl-bonded stationary phase is used. The first discussion of the thermodynamics involved in the retention mechanism was published by Armstrong and Nome in 1981. In MLC, there are three partition coefficients which must be taken into account. The solute will partition between the water and the stationary phase (KSW), the water and the micelles (KMW), and the micelles and the stationary phase (KSM).

Armstrong and Nome derived an equation describing the partition coefficients in terms of the retention factor (formally capacity factor), k¢. In HPLC, the capacity factor represents the molar ratio of the solute in the stationary phase to the mobile phase. The capacity factor is easily measure based on retention times of the compound and any unretained compound. The equation rewritten by Guermouche et al. is presented here:

1/k¢ = [n • (KMW-1)/(f • KSW)] • CM +1/(f • KSW)

Where:

- k¢ is the capacity factor of the solute
- KSW is the partition coefficient of the solute between the stationary phase and the water
- KMW is the partition coefficient of the solute between the micelles and the water
- f is the phase volume ratio (stationary phase volume/mobile phase volume)
- n is the molar volume of the surfactant
- CM is the concentration of the micelle in the mobile phase (total surfactant concentration - critical micelle concentration)

A plot of 1/k¢ verses CM gives a straight line in which KSW can be calculated from the intercept and KMW can be obtained from the ratio of the slope to the intercept. Finally, KSM can be obtained from the ratio of the other two partition coefficients:

KSM = KSW/ KMW

As can be observed from Figure 1, KMW is independent of any effects from the stationary phase, assuming the same micellar mobile phase.

The validity of the retention mechanism proposed by Armstrong and Nome has been successfully, and repeated confirmed experimentally. However, some variations and alternate theories have also been proposed. Jandera and Fischer developed equations to describe the dependence of retention behavior on the change in micellar concentrations. They found that the retention of most compounds tested decreased with increasing concentrations of micelles. From this, it can be surmised that the compounds associate with the micelles as they spend less time associated with the stationary phase.

Foley proposed a similar retentive model to that of Armstrong and Nome which was a general model for secondary chemical equilibria in liquid chromatography. While this model was developed in a previous reference, and could be used for any secondary chemical equilibria such as acid-base equilibria, and ion-pairing, Foley further refined the model for MLC. When an equilibrant (X), in this case surfactant, is added to the mobile phase, a secondary equilibria is created in which an analyte will exist as free analyte (A), and complexed with the equilibrant (AX). The two forms will be retained by the stationary phase to different extents, thus allowing the retention to be varied by adjusting the concentration of equilibrant (micelles).

The resulting equation solved for capacity factor in terms of partition coefficients is much the same as that of Armstrong and Nome:

1/k¢ = (KSM/k¢S) • [M] + 1/k¢S

Where:

- k¢ is the capacity factor of the complexed solute and the free solute
- k¢S is the capacity factor of the free solute
- KSM is the partition coefficient of the solute between the stationary phase and the micelle
- [M] may be either the concentration of surfactant or the concentration of micelle

Foley used the above equation to determine the solute-micelle association constants and free solute retention factors for a variety of solutes with different surfactants and stationary phases. From this data, it is possible to predict the type and optimum surfactant concentrations needed for a given solute or solutes.

Foley has not been the only researcher interested in determining the solute-micelle association constants. A review article by Marina and Garcia with 53 references discusses the usefulness of obtaining solute-micelle association constants. The association constants for two solutes can be used to help understand the retention mechanism. The separation factor of two solutes, a, can be expressed as KSM1/KSM2. If the experimental a coincides with the ratio of the two solute-micelle partition coefficients, it can be assumed that their retention occurs through a direct transfer from the micellar phase to the stationary phase. In addition, calculation of a would allow for prediction of separation selectivity before the analysis is performed, provided the two coefficients are known.

The desire to predict retention behavior and selectivity has led to the development of several mathematical models. Changes in pH, surfactant concentration, and concentration of organic modifier play a significant role in determining the chromatographic separation. Often one or more of these parameters need to be optimized to achieve the desired separation, yet the optimum parameters must take all three variables into account simultaneously. The review by Garcia-Alvarez-Coque et al. mentioned several successful models for varying scenarios, a few of which will be mentioned here. The classic models by Armstrong and Nome and Foley are used to describe the general cases. Foley's model applies to many cases and has been experimentally verified for ionic, neutral, polar and nonpolar solutes; anionic, cationic, and non-ionic surfactants, and C8, C¬18, and cyano stationary phases. The model begins to deviate for highly and lowly retained solutes. Highly retained solutes may become irreversibly bound to the stationary phase, where lowly retained solutes may elute in the column void volume.

Other models proposed by Arunyanart and Cline-Love and Rodgers and Khaledi describe the effect of pH on the retention of weak acids and bases. These authors derived equations relating pH and micellar concentration to retention. As the pH varies, sigmoidal behavior is observed for the retention of acidic and basic species. This model has been shown to accurately predict retention behavior. Still other models predict behavior in hybrid micellar systems using equations or modeling behavior based on controlled experimentation. Additionally, models accounting for the simultaneous effect of pH, micelle and organic concentration have been suggested. These models allow for further enhancement of the optimization of the separation of weak acids and bases.

One research group, Rukhadze, et al. derived a first order linear relationship describing the influence of micelle and organic concentration, and pH on the selectivity and resolution of seven barbiturates. The researchers discovered that a second order mathematical equation would more precisely fit the data. The derivations and experimental details are beyond the scope of this discussion. The model was successful in predicting the experimental conditions necessary to achieve a separation for compounds which are traditionally difficult to resolve.

Jandera, Fischer, and Effenberger approached the modeling problem in yet another way. The model used was based on lipophilicity and polarity indices of solutes. The lipophilicity index relates a given solute to a hypothetical number of carbon atoms in an alkyl chain. It is based and depends on a given calibration series determined experimentally. The lipophilicity index should be independent of the stationary phase and organic modifier concentration. The polarity index is a measure of the polarity of the solute-solvent interactions. It depends strongly on the organic solvent, and somewhat on the polar groups present in the stationary phase. 23 compounds were analyzed with varying mobile phases and compared to the lipophilicity and polarity indices. The results showed that the model could be applied to MLC, but better predictive behavior was found with concentrations of surfactant below the CMC, sub-micellar.

A final type of model based on molecular properties of a solute is a branch of quantitative structure-activity relationships (QSAR). QSAR studies attempt to correlate biological activity of drugs, or a class of drugs, with structures. The normally accepted means of uptake for a drug, or its metabolite, is through partitioning into lipid bilayers. The descriptor most often used in QSAR to determine the hydrophobicity of a compound is the octanol-water partition coefficient, log P. MLC provides an attractive and practical alternative to QSAR. When micelles are added to a mobile phase, many similarities exist between the micellar mobile phase/stationary phase and the biological membrane/water interface. In MLC, the stationary phase become modified by the adsorption of surfactant monomers which are structurally similar to the membranous hydrocarbon chains in the biological model. Additionally, the hydrophilic/hydrophobic interactions of the micelles are similar to that in the polar regions of a membrane. Thus, the development of quantitative structure-retention relationships (QRAR) has become widespread.

Escuder-Gilabert et al. tested three different QRAR retention models on ionic compounds. Several classes of compounds were tested including catecholamines, local anesthetics, diuretics, and amino acids. The best model relating log K and log P was found to be one in which the total molar charge of a compound at a given pH is included as a variable. This model proved to give fairly accurate predictions of log P, R > 0.9. Other studies have been performed which develop predictive QRAR models for tricyclic antidepressants and barbiturates.

== Efficiency ==
The main limitation in the use of MLC is the reduction in efficiency (peak broadening) that is observed when purely aqueous micellar mobile phases are used. Several explanations for the poor efficiency have been theorized. Poor wetting of the stationary phase by the micellar aqueous mobile phase, slow mass transfer between the micelles and the stationary phase, and poor mass transfer within the stationary phase have all been postulated as possible causes. To enhance efficiency, the most common approaches have been the addition of small amounts of isopropyl alcohol and increase in temperature. A review by Berthod studied the combined theories presented above and applied the Knox equation to independently determine the cause of the reduced efficiency. The Knox equation is commonly used in HPLC to describe the different contributions to overall band broadening of a solute. The Knox equation is expressed as:

h = An^(1/3)+ B/n + Cn

Where:

- h = the reduced plate height count (plate height/stationary phase particle diameter)
- n = the reduced mobile phase linear velocity (velocity times stationary phase particle diameter/solute diffusion coefficient in the mobile phase)
- A, B, and C are constants related to solute flow anisotropy (eddy diffusion), molecular longitudinal diffusion, and mass transfer properties respectively.

Berthod's use of the Knox equation to experimentally determine which of the proposed theories was most correct led him to the following conclusions. The flow anisotropy in micellar phase seems to be much greater than in traditional hydro-organic mobile phases of similar viscosity. This is likely due to the partial clogging of the stationary phase pores by adsorbed surfactant molecules. Raising the column temperature served to both decrease viscosity of the mobile phase and the amount of adsorbed surfactant. Both results reduce the A term and the amount of eddy diffusion, and thereby increase efficiency.

The increase in the B term, as related to longitudinal diffusion, is associated with the decrease in the solute diffusion coefficient in the mobile phase, DM, due to the presence of the micelles, and an increase in the capacity factor, k¢. Again, this is related to surfactant adsorption on the stationary phase causing a dramatic decrease in the solute diffusion coefficient in the stationary phase, DS. Again an increase in temperature, now coupled with an addition of alcohol to the mobile phase, drastically decreases the amount of the absorbed surfactant. In turn, both actions reduce the C term caused by a slow mass transfer from the stationary phase to the mobile phase. Further optimization of efficiency can be gained by reducing the flow rate to one closely matched to that derived from the Knox equation. Overall, the three proposed theories seemed to have contributing effects of the poor efficiency observed, and can be partially countered by the addition of organic modifiers, particularly alcohol, and increasing the column temperature.

== Applications ==
Despite the reduced efficiency verses reversed phase HPLC, hundreds of applications have been reported using MLC. One of the most advantageous is the ability to directly inject physiological fluids. Micelles have an ability to solubilize proteins which enables MLC to be useful in analyzing untreated biological fluids such as plasma, serum, and urine. Martinez et al. found MLC to be highly useful in analyzing a class of drugs called b-antagonists, so called beta-blockers, in urine samples. The main advantage of the use of MLC with this type of sample, is the great time savings in sample preparation. Alternative methods of analysis including reversed phase HPLC require lengthy extraction and sample work up procedures before analysis can begin. With MLC, direct injection is often possible, with retention times of less than 15 minutes for the separation of up to nine b-antagonists.

Another application compared reversed phase HPLC with MLC for the analysis of desferrioxamine in serum. Desferrioxamine (DFO) is a commonly used drug for removal of excess iron in patients with chronic and acute levels. The analysis of DFO along with its chelated complexes, Fe(III) DFO and Al(III) DFO has proven to be difficult at best in previous attempts. This study found that direct injection of the serum was possible for MLC, verses an ultrafiltration step necessary in HPLC. This analysis proved to have difficulties with the separation of the chelated DFO compounds and with the sensitivity levels for DFO itself when MLC was applied. The researcher found that, in this case, reverse phase HPLC, was a better, more sensitive technique despite the time savings in direct injection.

Analysis of pharmaceuticals by MLC is also gaining popularity. The selectivity and peak shape of MLC over commonly used ion-pair chromatography is much enhanced. MLC mimics, yet enhances, the selectivity offered by ion-pairing reagents for the separation of active ingredients in pharmaceutical drugs. For basic drugs, MLC improves the excessive peak tailing frequently observed in ion-pairing. Hydrophilic drugs are often unretained using conventional HPLC, are retained by MLC due to solubilization into the micelles. Commonly found drugs in cold medications such as acetaminophen, L-ascorbic acid, phenylpropanolamine HCL, tipepidine hibenzate, and chlorpheniramine maleate have been successfully separated with good peak shape using MLC. Additional basic drugs like many narcotics, such as codeine and morphine, have also been successfully separated using MLC.

Another novel application of MLC involves the separation and analysis of inorganic compounds, mostly simple ions. This is a relatively new area for MLC, but has seen some promising results. MLC has been observed to provide better selectivity of inorganic ions that ion-exchange or ion-pairing chromatography. While this application is still in the beginning stages of development, the possibilities exist for novel, much enhanced separations of inorganic species.

Since the technique was first reported on in 1980, micellar liquid chromatography has been used in hundreds of applications. This micelle controlled technique provides for unique opportunities for solving complicated separation problems. Despite the poor efficiency of MLC, it has been successfully used in many applications. The use of MLC in the future appears to be extremely advantages in the areas of physiological fluids, pharmaceuticals, and even inorganic ions. The technique has proven to be superior over ion-pairing and ion-exchange for many applications. As new approaches are developed to combat the poor efficiency of MLC, its application is sure to spread and gain more acceptance.
