= Antibody opsonization =

Immune system process

Antibody opsonization is a process by which a pathogen is marked for phagocytosis through coating of a target cell with antibodies. Immunoglobulins participate in molecular tagging of pathogens which display antigens recognised by their specific paratope. The binding of antibodies enhances pathogen identification and recruitment of immune effector cells, ultimately accelerating microbial clearance through phagocytic destruction or antibody-dependent cellular cytotoxicity.

1) Antibodies (A) and pathogens (B) circulating in the blood. 2) The antibodies bind to pathogens with complementary antigen sequences, engaging in opsonization (2a), neutralisation (2b), and agglutination (2c). 3) A phagocyte (C) approaches the pathogen, and Fc region (D) of the antibody binds to one of the Fc receptors (E) on the phagocyte. 4) Phagocytosis of antibody-marked pathogen

== Principles ==
Antibody-mediated opsonisation (marking) of pathogens depends on high affinity paratope-epitope interactions. Immunoglobulins are highly effective opsonins, with the IgG subclasses IgG1 and IgG3 being recognised as the most efficacious opsonins in humans.

Antibodies structurally contain two important domains

1. Fab domain - the region of the antibody which displays the paratope capable of binding to antigenic epitopes
2. Fc fragment - the 'tail' region of the Y-shaped immunoglobulin which provides a binding site for endogenous Fc receptors (FcRs) displayed on immune cell surfaces

This Fc domain allows antibodies to engage with various effector leukocytes, enhancing the detection and elimination of encountered pathogens. The interaction with leukocytes is largely driven by the predominant antibody isotype as well as the presence and concentration of immune cells recruited to the local environment. The resulting immune cell recruitment may result in phagocytosis if monocytes, macrophages, or neutrophils are the primary cells recruited, release of granzymes and other killing factors if NK cells or neutrophils are recruited, and release of pro-inflammatory cytokines in nearly all cases.

== Recruitment and clearance ==
=== Antibody-stimulated phagocytosis ===
Mononuclear phagocytes and neutrophils express FcRs that bind strongly to the Fc regions of particular antibody isotypes.

During a normal inflammatory response, microbial pathogen-associated molecular patterns (PAMPs) bind with phagocytic pattern recognition receptors (PRRs), triggering sequential intracellular signalling cascades culminating in phagocytotic clearance. Co-expression of opsonin receptors such as FcRs enhances their ability to detect microbes which have been tagged by as pathogenic.

These interactions result in envelopment of the particle by the cytoplasmic membrane of the phagocytic cell, until the particle is contained in a membrane-bound vacuole (phagosome) within the cell. The pathogen is subsequently destroyed following intracellular vesicle fusion with lytic vessels.

=== Antibody-dependent cell-mediated cytotoxicity ===
In antibody-dependent cell-mediated cytotoxicity, the pathogen does not need to be internalised to be destroyed. ADCC requires an effector cell with the ability to eliminate pathogens through release of cytotoxic agents, most notably natural killer cells. However, macrophages, neutrophils and eosinophils are sometimes implicated.

During this process, the pathogen is opsonized and bound with the antibody IgG via its Fab domain. Cells with cyotoxic function (e.g. NK cells) expresses Fcγ receptors which recognize and bind to the reciprocal Fc portion of an antibody. This receptor conjugation triggers degranulation and release of cytotoxic granules containing perforin and granzymes to kill antibody-sensitized target cells.
