= Electro precipitation =

Electro precipitation is the removal of heavy metal ions, charged colloids, emulsions and microorganisms by passing direct electric current (introduced via parallel plates constructed of various metals that are selected to optimize the removal process) through contaminated water. Since the targeted contaminants are primarily held in solution by electrical charges, the addition of ions having a charge opposite of the contaminants causes them to destabilize and aggregate into larger particles. This neutralization of the ions and colloids results in a precipitate.
