= Column chromatography =

Method to isolate a compound in a mixture

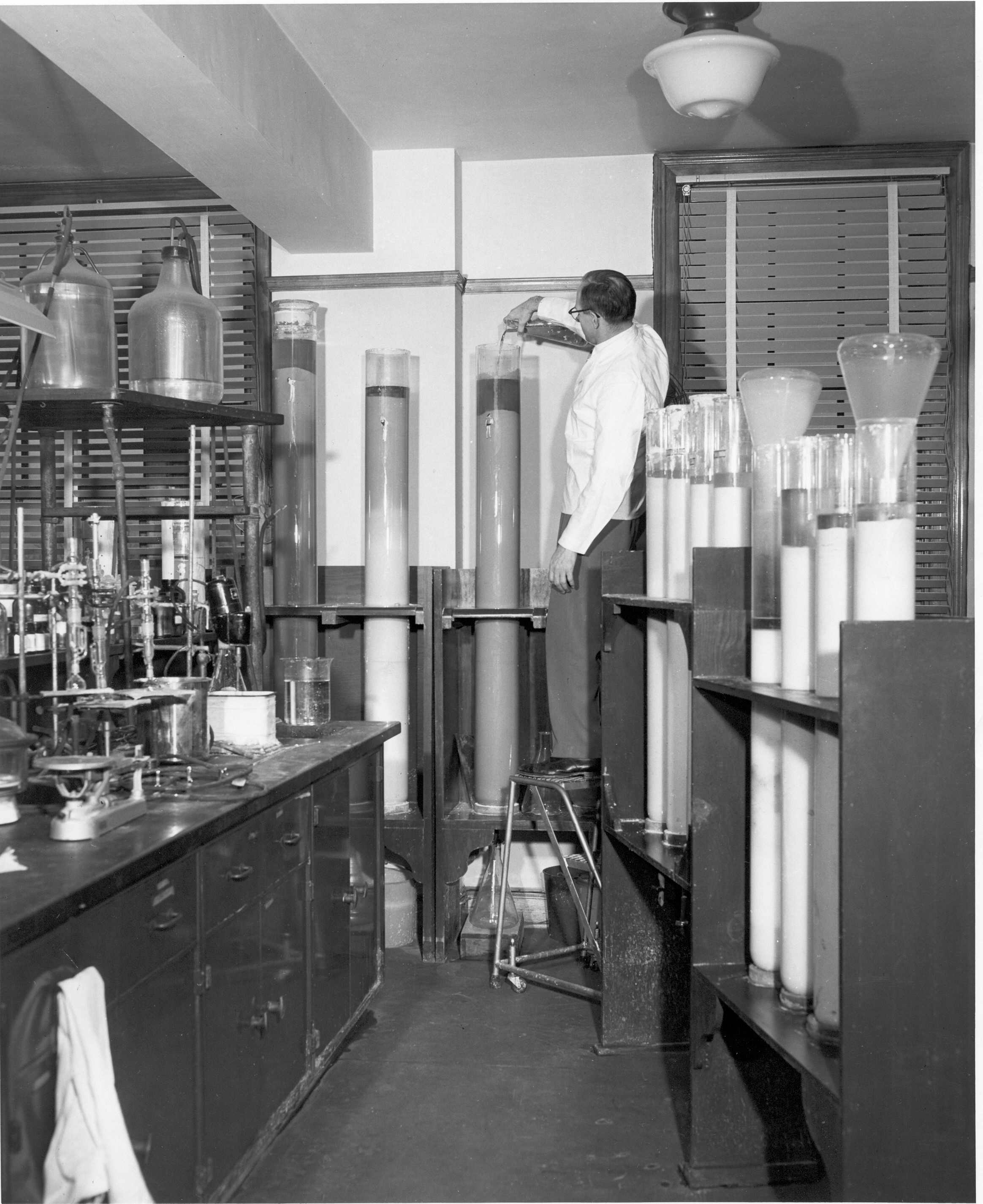
A chemist in the 1950s using column chromatography. The Erlenmeyer flasks on the floor receive the output.

Column chromatography is a chromatography method used in analytical chemistry to separate the individual components (analytes) of a mixture. The mixture is carried by a solvent (the eluent) to form the mobile phase. The mobile phase moves through a column packed with solid particles (the stationary phase). The components adsorb to the stationary phase at different rates, so they pass out of the column at different times. This separates the components.

The technique is widely applicable, as many different adsorbents (normal phase, reversed phase, or otherwise) can be used with a wide range of solvents. The technique can be used on scales from micrograms up to kilograms. The main advantage of column chromatography is its cost is relatively low, and the stationary phase can be replaced after use. The latter prevents cross-contamination and stationary phase degradation due to recycling. The mobile phase moves by gravity, compressed gas, or pressurized pumps (as in high-performance liquid chromatography).

Before performing column chromatography, one usually performs thin-layer chromatography on a small amount of the sample first, to see how a mixture of compounds will behave when purified by column chromatography. This allows the experimenter to optimize the combination of mobile and stationary phases for this particular sample.

== Column preparation ==
A column is prepared by packing a solid adsorbent into a cylindrical glass or plastic tube. The size will depend on the amount of compound being isolated. The base of the tube contains a filter to hold the solid phase in place. The filter is either a plug made of cotton or glass wool, or a glass frit. A solvent reservoir may be attached at the top of the column.

Two methods are generally used to prepare a column: the dry method and the wet method. For the dry method, the column is first filled with dry stationary phase powder, followed by the addition of mobile phase, which is flushed through the column until it is completely wet, and from this point is never allowed to run dry. For the wet method, a slurry is prepared of the eluent with the stationary phase powder and then carefully poured into the column. The top of the silica should be flat, and the top of the silica can be protected by a layer of sand. Eluent is slowly passed through the column to advance the organic material.

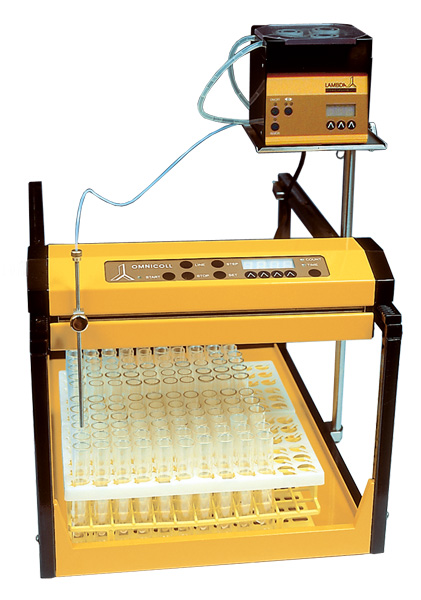
Automated fraction collector and sampler for chromatography techniques

The individual components are retained by the stationary phase differently and separate from each other while they are running at different speeds through the column with the eluent. At the end of the column they elute one at a time. During the entire chromatography process the eluent is collected in a series of fractions. Fractions can be collected automatically by means of fraction collectors. The productivity of chromatography can be increased by running several columns at a time. In this case multi stream collectors are used. The composition of the eluent flow can be monitored and each fraction is analyzed for dissolved compounds, e.g. by analytical chromatography, UV absorption spectra, or fluorescence. Colored compounds (or fluorescent compounds with the aid of a UV lamp) can be seen through the glass wall as moving bands.

== Stationary phase ==
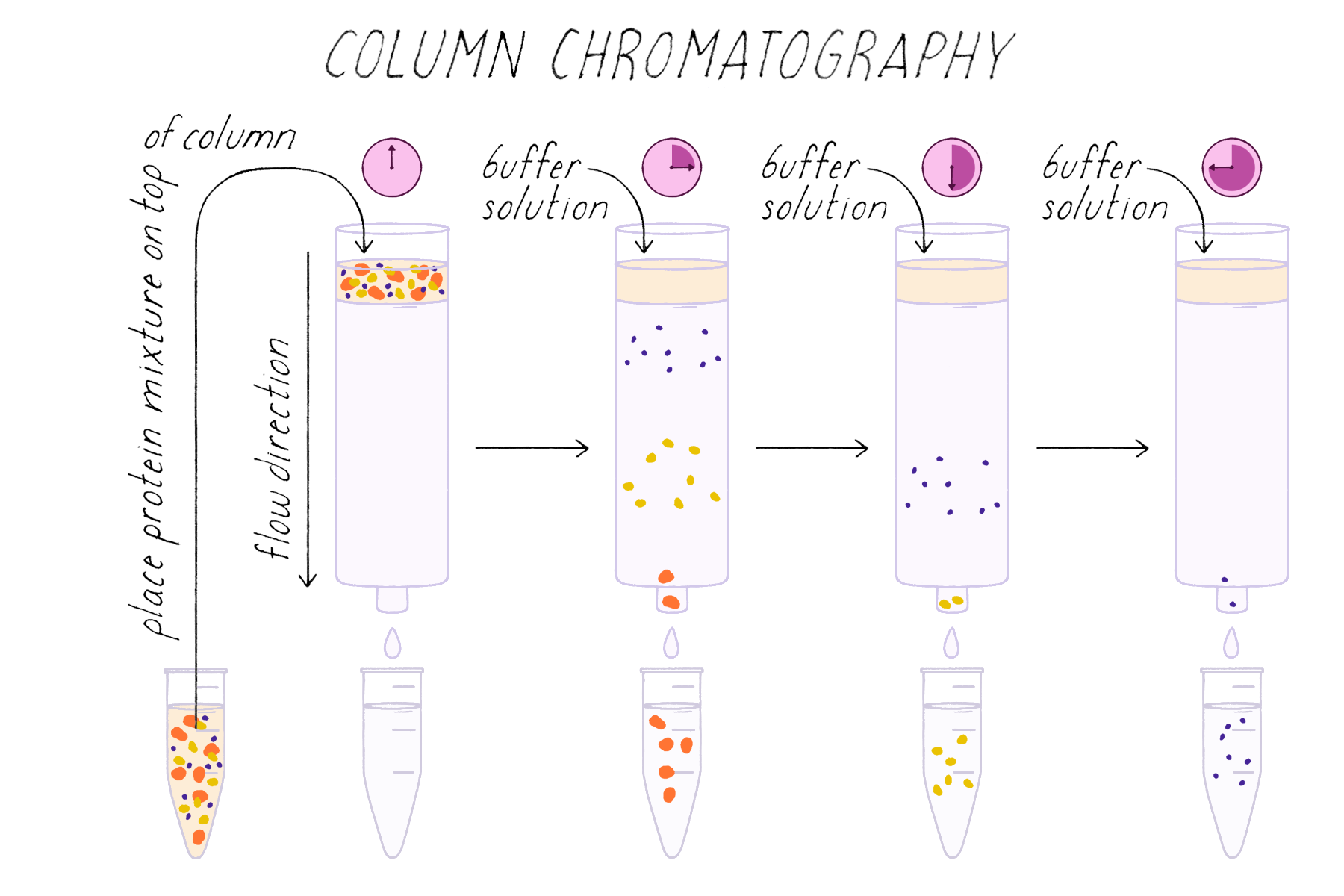
A complex mixture of molecules is applied to a column filled with a slurry of small beads; molecules that form stronger interactions with the beads flow more slowly through the column and are eluted later.

In column chromatography, the column contains a packed column of solid particles, finely ground powders, or gels. This is called the stationary phase or adsorbent. It is most often made of silica gel or alumina. Cellulose powder has often been used in the past.

A wide range of stationary phases are available in order to different forms of column chromatographies: ion exchange chromatography, reversed-phase chromatography (RP), affinity chromatography or expanded bed adsorption (EBA). The solid phase may be microporous for an increased surface, though EBA uses a fluidized bed.

In general, one should use much more stationary phase than the analyte mixture. For silica column chromatography in particular, for each gram of dry mass of the analyte mixture, there should be 20 to 100 grams of the stationary phase. Using more silica would increase the resolving power of the chromatography, but also make it slower.

== Mobile phase (eluent) ==
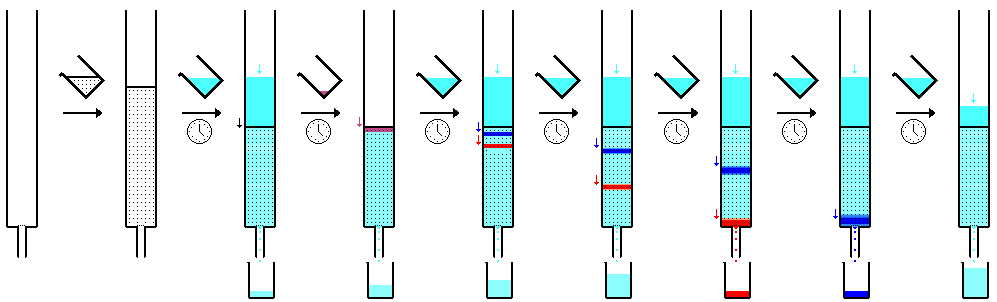
Column chromatography proceeds by a series of steps.

The mobile phase or eluent is a solvent or a mixture of solvents used to move the compounds through the column.

The main criteria for choosing an appropriate eluent concerns the retention factor:

- The retention factor of the compound of interest should be around 0.2 - 0.3 in order to minimize the time and the amount of eluent to run the chromatography.
- The other compounds should have retention factors quite different from that of the compount of interest.

To pick a good eluent, one run multiple small scale pretests, often using thin layer chromatography (TLC) with the same stationary phase, using solvents of different polarity, until a suitable solvent system is found.

Common mobile phase solvents, in order of increasing polarity, include hexane, dichloromethane, ethyl acetate, acetone, and methanol. A common solvent system is hexane:ethyl acetate mixture. The proportions are adjusted so that the target compound has a retention factor of 0.2 - 0.3.

Contrary to common misconception, methanol alone can be used as an eluent for highly polar compounds, and does not dissolve silica gel.

The eluent flow rate can be optimized. A higher flow rate eluent decreases the time required to run a column and thereby decreases diffusion, improving the resolving power. However, if the flow rate is too high, the analyte would fail to equilibrate between the stationary phase and mobile phase (see Van Deemter's equation).

To increase the flow rate of a gravity-flow column chromatography, one can increase the height of the fresh eluent column above the top of the stationary phase, or decrease the tap controls. It can also be increased by using a pump or by using compressed gas (e.g. air, nitrogen, or argon) to push the solvent through the column (flash column chromatography).

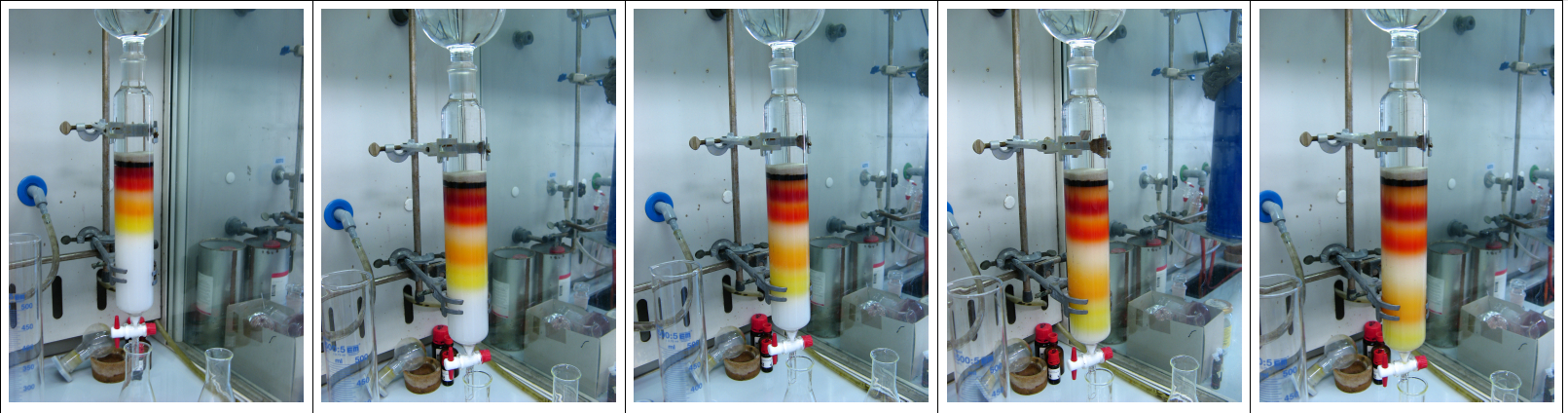
Photographic sequence of a column chromatography

The particle size of the stationary phase is generally finer in flash column chromatography than in gravity column chromatography. For example, one of the most widely used silica gel grades in the former technique is mesh 230 – 400 (40 – 63 μm), while the latter technique typically requires mesh 70 – 230 (63 – 200 μm) silica gel.

== Low pressure liquid chromatography ==
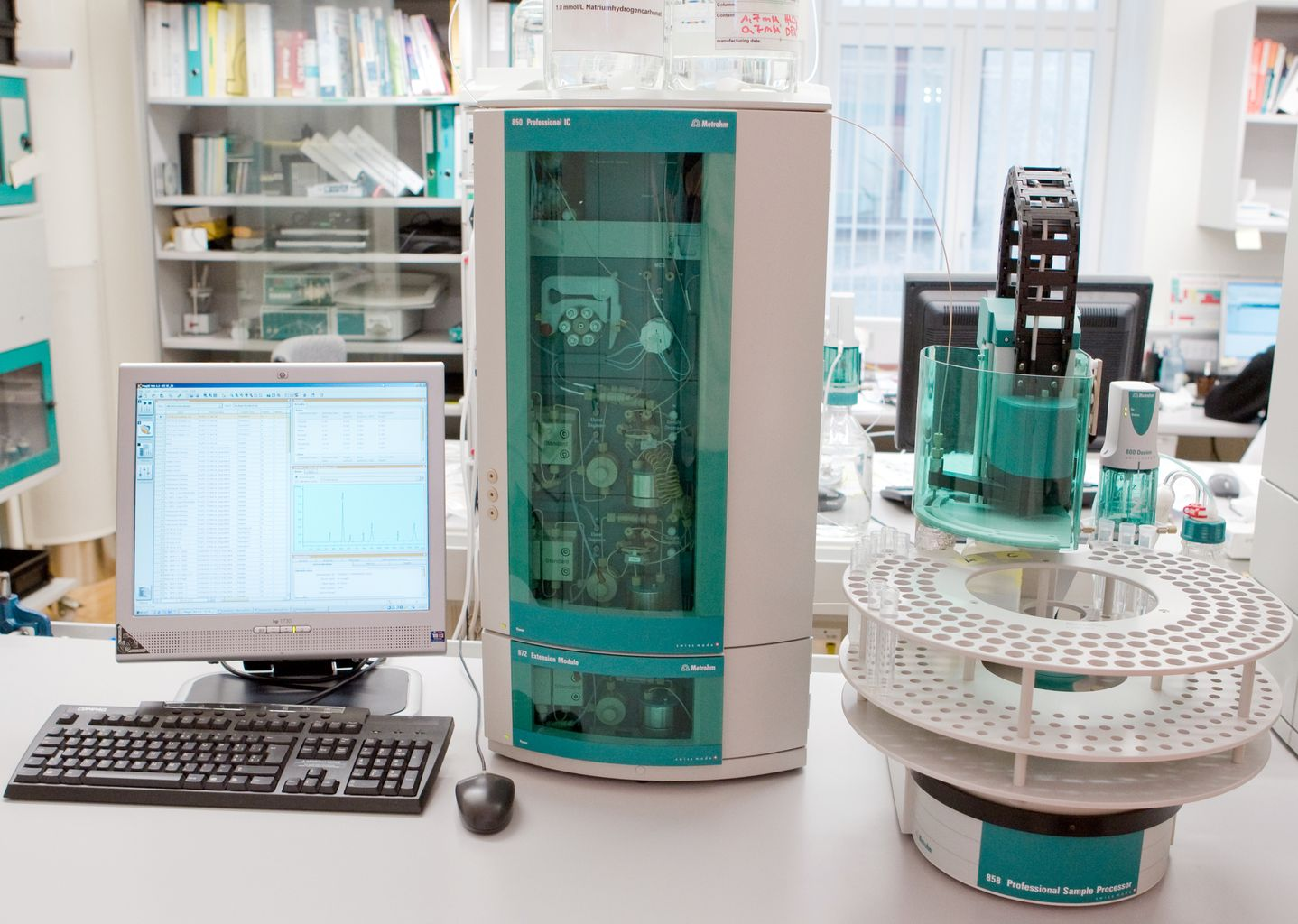
An automated ion chromatography system.

Column chromatography takes a long time. Many manufacturers like Biotage, Buchi, Interchim and Teledyne Isco have developed automated flash chromatography systems that minimize human involvement in the purification process.

Such systems are typically referred to as low pressure liquid chromatography (LPLC). They include components normally found on more expensive high pressure liquid chromatography (HPLC) systems such as a gradient pump, sample injection ports, a UV detector and a fraction collector to collect the eluent, but operating at a lower pressure (usually 350–525 kPa or 50.8–76.1 psi). Typically these automated systems can separate samples from a few milligrams up to an industrial many kilogram scale, and are cheaper and faster than doing multiple injections on preparative HPLC systems.

The resolution (or the ability to separate a mixture) of an LPLC system is lower, as the packing material in an HPLC column can be much smaller, typically only 5 micrometre. This increases the stationary phase surface for interactions, and gives better separation. However, small packing media causes the high back pressure, thus "high pressure" liquid chromatography

The LPLC columns are typically packed with silica of around 50 micrometres, thus reducing back pressure and resolution, but it also removes the need for expensive high pressure pumps. Manufacturers are now starting to move into higher pressure flash chromatography systems, which operate above 1 MPa (150 psi), calling them "medium pressure liquid chromatography" (MPLC).

== Column chromatogram resolution calculation ==
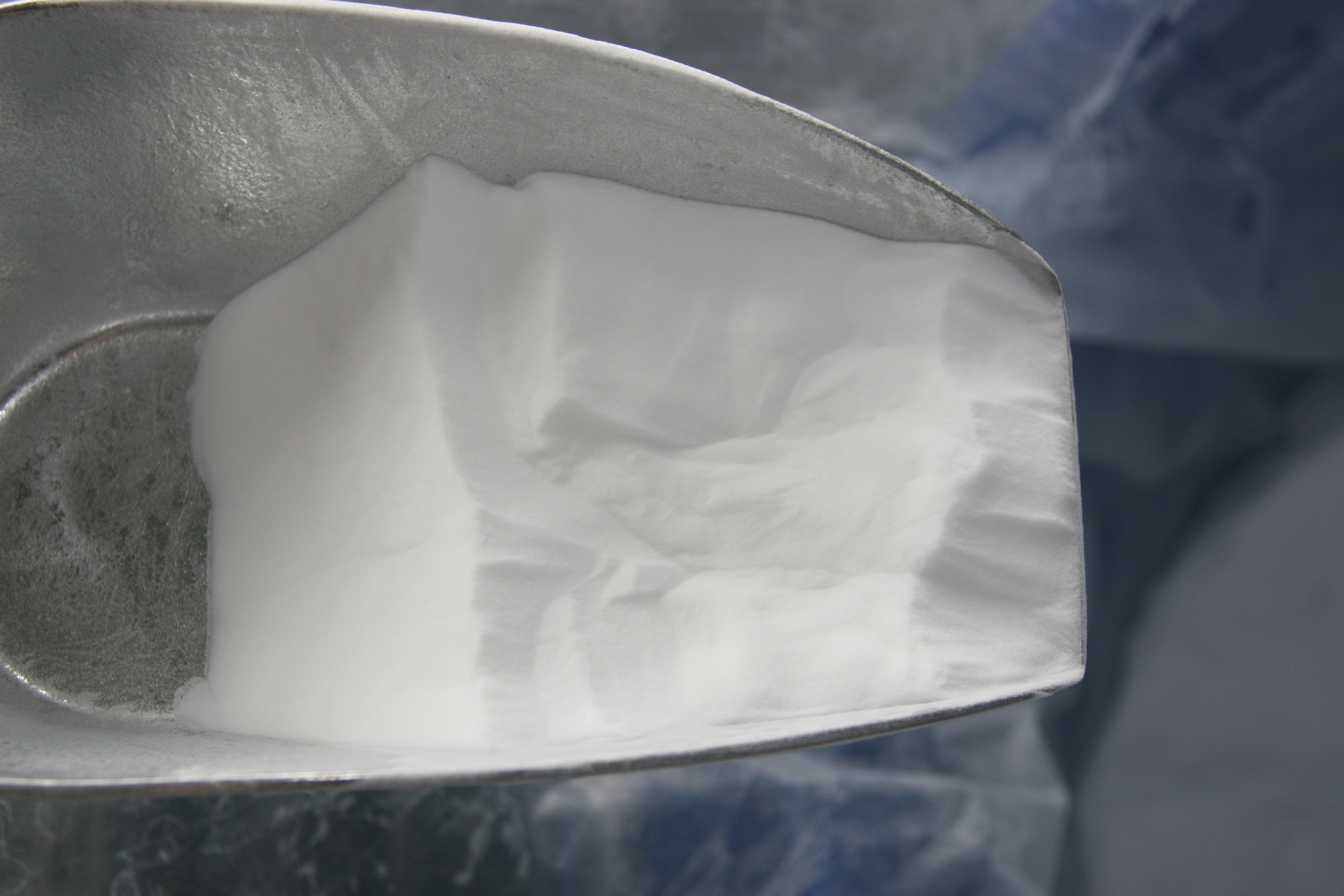
Powdery silica gel for column chromatography

Typically, column chromatography is set up with peristaltic pumps, flowing buffers and the solution sample through the top of the column. The solutions and buffers pass through the column where a fraction collector at the end of the column setup collects the eluted samples. Prior to the fraction collection, the samples that are eluted from the column pass through a detector such as a spectrophotometer or mass spectrometer so that the concentration of the separated samples in the sample solution mixture can be determined.

For example, if you were to separate two different proteins with different binding capacities to the column from a solution sample, a good type of detector would be a spectrophotometer using a wavelength of 280 nm. The higher the concentration of protein that passes through the eluted solution through the column, the higher the absorbance of that wavelength.

Because the column chromatography has a constant flow of eluted solution passing through the detector at varying concentrations, the detector must plot the concentration of the eluted sample over a course of time. This plot of sample concentration versus time is called a chromatogram.

The ultimate goal of chromatography is to separate different components from a solution mixture. The resolution expresses the extent of separation between the components from the mixture. The higher the resolution of the chromatogram, the better the extent of separation of the samples the column gives. This data is a good way of determining the column's separation properties of that particular sample. The resolution can be calculated from the chromatogram.

The separate curves in the diagram represent different sample elution concentration profiles over time based on their affinity to the column resin. To calculate resolution, the retention time and curve width are required.

Retention time is the time from the start of signal detection by the detector to the peak height of the elution concentration profile of each different sample.

Curve width is the width of the concentration profile curve of the different samples in the chromatogram in units of time.

A simplified method of calculating chromatogram resolution is to use the plate model. The plate model assumes that the column can be divided into a certain number of sections, or plates and the mass balance can be calculated for each individual plate. This approach approximates a typical chromatogram curve as a Gaussian distribution curve. By doing this, the curve width is estimated as 4 times the standard deviation of the curve, 4σ. The retention time is the time from the start of signal detection to the time of the peak height of the Gaussian curve.

From the variables in the figure above, the resolution, plate number, and plate height of the column plate model can be calculated.

Resolution $R_s = 2\frac{t_{RB} - t_{RA}}{w_A + w_B}$, where

t_{RB} = retention time of solute B
t_{RA} = retention time of solute A
w_{B} = Gaussian curve width of solute B
w_{A} = Gaussian curve width of solute A

Plate Number $N = (4 t_R/w)^2$.

Plate Height $H = L/N$, where $L$ is the length of the column.

== Column adsorption equilibrium ==
For an adsorption column, the column resin (the stationary phase) is composed of microbeads. Even smaller particles such as proteins, carbohydrates, metal ions, or other chemical compounds are conjugated onto the microbeads. Each binding particle that is attached to the microbead can be assumed to bind in a 1:1 ratio with the solute sample sent through the column that needs to be purified or separated.

Binding between the target molecule to be separated and the binding molecule on the column beads can be modeled using a simple equilibrium reaction K_{eq} = [CS]/([C][S]) where K_{eq} is the equilibrium constant, [C] and [S] are the concentrations of the target molecule and the binding molecule on the column resin, respectively. [CS] is the concentration of the complex of the target molecule bound to the column resin.

Using this as a basis, three different isotherms can be used to describe the binding dynamics of a column chromatography: linear, Langmuir, and Freundlich.

The linear isotherm occurs when the solute concentration needed to be purified is very small relative to the binding molecule. Thus, the equilibrium can be defined as:

[CS] = K_{eq}[C].

For industrial scale uses, the total binding molecules on the column resin beads must be factored in because unoccupied sites must be taken into account. The Langmuir isotherm and Freundlich isotherm are useful in describing this equilibrium. The Langmuir isotherm is given by:

[CS] = (K_{eq}S_{tot}[C])/(1 + K_{eq}[C]), where S_{tot} is the total binding molecules on the beads.

The Freundlich isotherm is given by:

[CS] = K_{eq}[C]^{1/n}

The Freundlich isotherm is used when the column can bind to many different samples in the solution that needs to be purified. Because the many different samples have different binding constants to the beads, there are many different K_{eq}s. Therefore, the Langmuir isotherm is not a good model for binding in this case.

== See also ==
- Fast protein liquid chromatography (FPLC) – separation of proteins using column chromatography
- High-performance liquid chromatography (HPLC) – column chromatography using high pressure
