= Aqueous normal-phase chromatography =

Chromatographic technique

Aqueous normal phase chromatography
- Classification: chromatography

Other techniques
- Related: Hydrophilic interaction liquid chromatography; Ion exchange chromatography

Aqueous normal-phase chromatography (ANP) is a chromatographic technique that uses a polar stationary phase with a nonpolar mobile phase that contains water. It is "normal-phase" in the sense that polar analytes are retained by a polar stationary phase, but it differs from classical normal-phase chromatography in that the mobile phase contains water.

== Principle ==
In normal-phase chromatography, the stationary phase is polar and the mobile phase is nonpolar. In reversed-phase, the stationary phase is nonpolar and the mobile phase is polar. Typical stationary phases for normal-phase chromatography are silica or organic moieties with cyano and amino functional groups. For reversed phase, alkyl hydrocarbons are the preferred stationary phase; octadecyl (C18) is the most common stationary phase, but octyl (C8) and butyl (C4) are also used in some applications. The designations for the reversed phase materials refer to the length of the hydrocarbon chain.

In normal-phase chromatography, the least polar compounds elute first and the most polar compounds elute last. The mobile phase consists of a nonpolar solvent such as hexane or heptane mixed with a slightly more polar solvent such as isopropanol, ethyl acetate or chloroform. Retention decreases as the amount of polar solvent in the mobile phase increases. In reversed phase chromatography, the most polar compounds elute first with the more nonpolar compounds eluting later. The mobile phase is generally a mixture of water and miscible polarity-modifying organic solvent, such as methanol, acetonitrile or THF. Retention increases as the fraction of the polar solvent (water) in the mobile phase is higher. Normal phase chromatography retains molecules via an adsorptive mechanism, and is used for the analysis of solutes readily soluble in organic solvents. Separation is achieved based on the polarity differences among functional groups such as amines, acids, metal complexes, etc. as well as their steric properties, while in reversed-phase chromatography, a partition mechanism typically occurs for the separation by non-polar differences.

In the aqueous normal-phase chromatography the support is based on a silica with "hydride surface" which is distinguishable from the other silica support materials, used either in normal phase, reversed phase, or hydrophilic interaction chromatography. Most silica materials used for chromatography have a surface composed primarily of silanols (-Si-OH). In a "hydride surface" the terminal groups are primarily -Si-H. The hydride surface can also be functionalized with carboxylic acids and long-chain alkyl groups. Mobile phases for ANPC are based on organic solvents as bulk solvents (such as methanol or acetonitrile) with a small amount of water as a modifier of polarity; thus, the mobile phase is both "aqueous" (water is present) and "normal phase type" (less polar than the stationary phase). Thus, polar solutes (such as acids and amines) are more strongly retained, with the ability to affect the retention, which decreases as the amount of water in the mobile phase increases.

Typically the mobile phases are rich with organic solvents, with amount of the nonpolar solvent in the mobile phase at least 60% or greater to reach minimal required retention. A true ANP stationary phase will be able to function in both the reversed phase and normal phase modes with only the amount of water in the eluent varying. Thus a continuum of solvents can be used from 100% aqueous to pure organic. ANP retention has been demonstrated for a variety of polar compounds on the hydride based stationary phases. Recent investigations have demonstrated that silica hydride materials have a very thin water layer (about 0.5 monolayer) in comparison to HILIC phases that can have from 6–8 monolayers. In addition the substantial negative charge on the surface of hydride phases is the result of hydroxide ion adsorption from the solvent rather than silanols.

== Features ==
An interesting feature of these phases is that both polar and nonpolar compounds can be retained over some range of mobile phase composition (organic/aqueous). The retention mechanism of polar compounds has recently been shown to be the result of the formation of a hydroxide layer on the surface of the silica hydride. Thus positively charged analytes are attracted to the negatively charged surface and other polar analytes are likely to be retained through displacement of hydroxide or other charged species on the surface. This property distinguishes it from a pure HILIC (hydrophilic interaction chromatography) columns where separation by polar differences is obtained through partitioning into a water-rich layer on the surface, or a pure RP stationary phase on which separation by nonpolar differences in solutes is obtained with very limited secondary mechanisms operating.

Another important feature of the hydride-based phases is that for many analyses it is usually not necessary to use a high pH mobile phase to analyze polar compounds such as bases. The aqueous component of the mobile phase usually contains from 0.1 to 0.5% formic or acetic acid, which is compatible with detector techniques that include mass spectral analysis.
