= Ion chromatography =

Laboratory technique to separate ions and polar molecules

Ion exchange chromatography
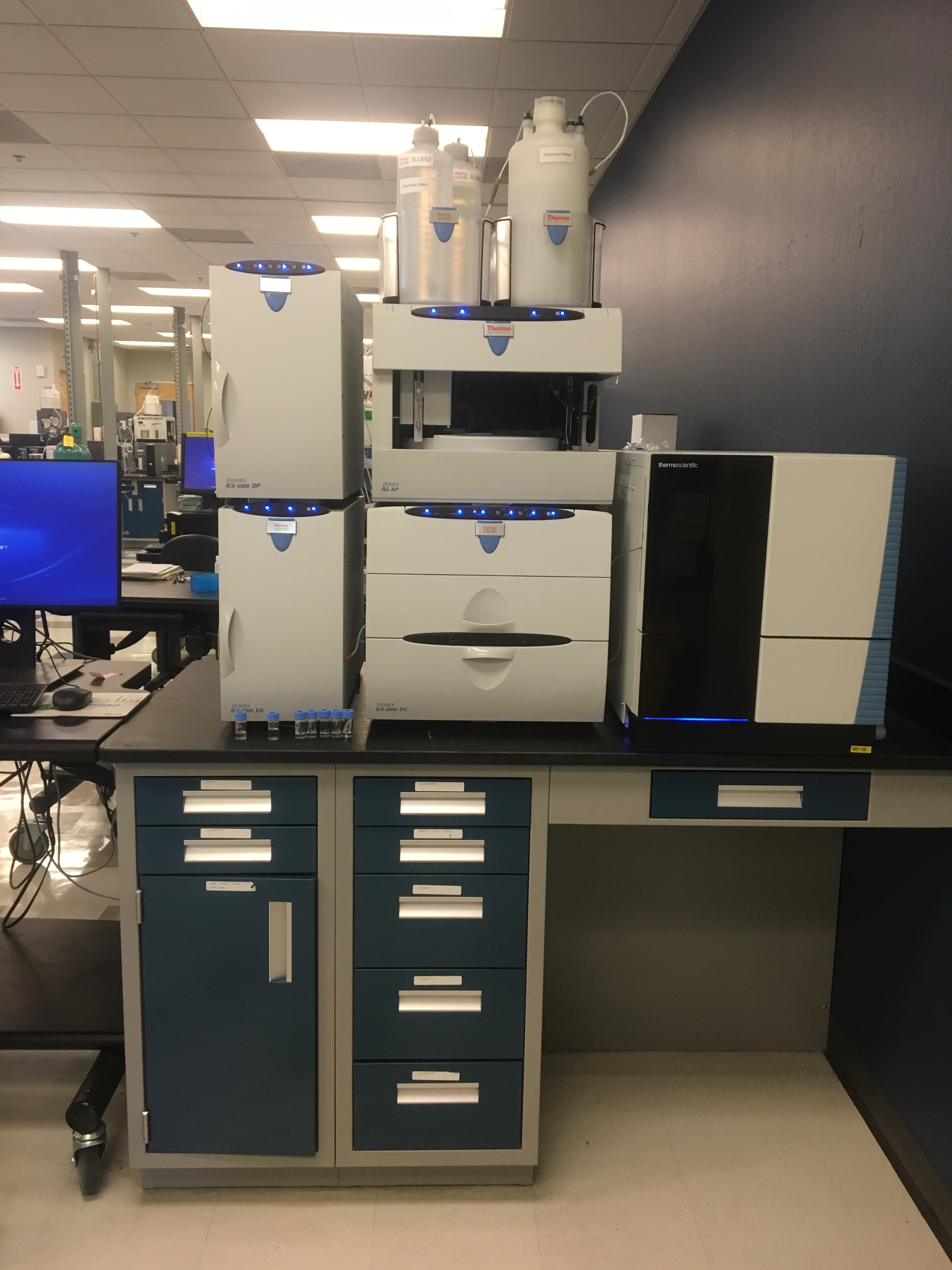
- A modern ion chromatography system
- Acronym: IC, IEC
- Classification: Chromatography

Other techniques
- Related: High performance liquid chromatography; Aqueous normal phase chromatography; Size exclusion chromatography; Micellar liquid chromatography

Ion chromatography (or ion-exchange chromatography; abbreviated IC or IEC) is a form of chromatography that separates ions and ionizable polar molecules based on their affinity to the ion exchanger. It works on almost any kind of charged molecule—including small inorganic anions, large proteins, small nucleotides, and amino acids. However, ion chromatography must be done in conditions that are one pH unit away from the isoelectric point of a protein.

The two types of ion chromatography are anion-exchange and cation-exchange. Cation-exchange chromatography is used when the molecule of interest is positively charged. The molecule is positively charged because the pH for chromatography is less than the pI (also known as pH(I)). In this type of chromatography, the stationary phase is negatively charged and positively charged molecules are loaded to be attracted to it. Anion-exchange chromatography is when the stationary phase is positively charged and negatively charged molecules (meaning that pH for chromatography is greater than the pI) are loaded to be attracted to it. It is often used in protein purification, water analysis, and quality control. The water-soluble and charged molecules such as proteins, amino acids, and peptides bind to moieties which are oppositely charged by forming ionic bonds to the insoluble stationary phase. The equilibrated stationary phase consists of an ionizable functional group where the targeted molecules of a mixture to be separated and quantified can bind while passing through the column—a cationic stationary phase is used to separate anions and an anionic stationary phase is used to separate cations. Cation exchange chromatography is used when the desired molecules to separate are cations and anion exchange chromatography is used to separate anions. The bound molecules then can be eluted and collected using an eluant which contains anions and cations by running a higher concentration of ions through the column or by changing the pH of the column.

One of the primary advantages for the use of ion chromatography is that only one interaction is involved in the separation, as opposed to other separation techniques; therefore, ion chromatography may have higher matrix tolerance. Another advantage of ion exchange is the predictability of elution patterns (based on the presence of the ionizable group). For example, when cation exchange chromatography is used, certain cations will elute out first and others later. A local charge balance is always maintained. However, there are also disadvantages involved when performing ion-exchange chromatography, such as constant evolution of the technique which leads to the inconsistency from column to column. A major limitation to this purification technique is that it is limited to ionizable group.

== History ==
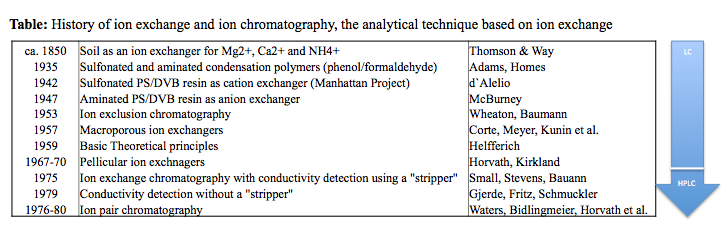
Ion exchange chromatography

Starting in 1947, Spedding and Powell used displacement ion-exchange chromatography for the separation of the rare-earth elements. Additionally, they showed the ion-exchange separation of 14N and 15N isotopes in ammonia. At the start of the 1950s, Kraus and Nelson demonstrated the use of many analytical methods for metal ions dependent on their separation of their chloride, fluoride, nitrate or sulfate complexes by anion chromatography. Automatic in-line detection was progressively introduced from 1960 to 1980 as well as novel chromatographic methods for metal ion separations. A groundbreaking method by Small, Stevens and Bauman at Dow Chemical Co. unfolded the creation of the modern ion chromatography. Anions and cations could now be separated efficiently by a system of suppressed conductivity detection. In 1979, a method for anion chromatography with non-suppressed conductivity detection was introduced by Gjerde et al. Following it in 1980, was a similar method for cation chromatography.

As a result, a period of extreme competition began within the IC market, with supporters for both suppressed and non-suppressed conductivity detection. This competition led to fast growth of new forms and the fast evolution of IC. A challenge that needs to be overcome in the future development of IC is the preparation of highly efficient monolithic ion-exchange columns and overcoming this challenge would be of great importance to the development of IC.

The boom of Ion exchange chromatography primarily began between 1935 and 1950 during World War II and applications and IC were significantly extended through the Manhattan Project. Ion chromatography was originally introduced by two English researchers, agricultural Sir Thompson and chemist J T Way. The works of Thompson and Way involved the action of water-soluble fertilizer salts, ammonium sulfate and potassium chloride. These salts could not easily be extracted from the ground due to the rain. They performed ion methods to treat clays with the salts, resulting in the extraction of ammonia in addition to the release of calcium. In the 1950s and 1960s, theoretical models were developed for IC for further understanding, and in the 1970s continuous detectors were utilized, paving the path for the development from low-pressure to high-performance chromatography. In 1975, "ion chromatography" was established as a name in reference to the techniques, and was thereafter used as a name for marketing purposes. Today, IC is important for investigating aqueous systems, such as drinking water. It is a popular method for analyzing anionic elements or complexes that help solve environmentally relevant problems. Likewise, it also has great uses in the semiconductor industry.

Because of the abundant separating columns, elution systems, and detectors available, chromatography has developed into the main method for ion analysis.

When this technique was initially developed, it was primarily used for water treatment. Since 1935, ion exchange chromatography rapidly manifested into one of the most heavily leveraged techniques, with its principles often being applied to majority of fields of chemistry, including distillation, adsorption, and filtration.

== Principle ==
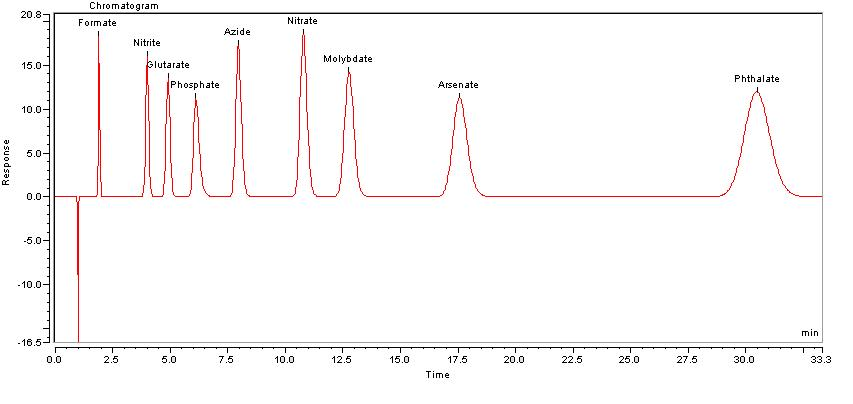
Ion chromatogram displaying anion separation

Ion-exchange chromatography separates molecules based on their respective charged groups. Ion-exchange chromatography retains analyte molecules on the column based on coulombic (ionic) interactions. The ion exchange chromatography matrix consists of positively and negatively charged ions. Essentially, molecules undergo electrostatic interactions with opposite charges on the stationary phase matrix. The stationary phase consists of an immobile matrix that contains charged ionizable functional groups or ligands. The stationary phase surface displays ionic functional groups (R-X) that interact with analyte ions of opposite charge. To achieve electroneutrality, these immobilized charges couple with exchangeable counterions in the solution. Ionizable molecules that are to be purified, compete with these exchangeable counterions, for binding to the immobilized charges on the stationary phase. These ionizable molecules are retained or eluted based on their charge. Initially, molecules that do not bind or bind weakly to the stationary phase are first to be washed away. Altered conditions are needed for the elution of the molecules that bind to the stationary phase. The concentration of the exchangeable counterions, which competes with the molecules for binding, can be increased, or the pH can be changed to affect the ionic charge of the eluent or the solute. A change in pH affects the charge on the particular molecules and, therefore, alter their binding. When reducing the net charge of the solute's molecules, they start eluting out. This way, such adjustments can be used to release the proteins of interest. Additionally, concentration of counterions can be gradually varied to affect the retention of the ionized molecules, thus separate them. This type of elution is called gradient elution. On the other hand, step elution can be used, in which the concentration of counterions are varied in steps. This type of chromatography is further subdivided into cation exchange chromatography and anion-exchange chromatography. Positively charged molecules bind to cation exchange resins, while negatively charged molecules bind to anion exchange resins. The ionic compound consisting of the cationic species M+ and the anionic species B− can be retained by the stationary phase.

Cation exchange chromatography retains positively charged cations because the stationary phase displays a negatively charged functional group:

$$\text{R-X}^-\text{C}^+\,+\, \text{M}^+ \, \text{B}^- \rightleftarrows \,\text{R-X}^-\text{M}^+ \,+\, \text{C}^+ \,+\, \text{B}^-$$

Anion exchange chromatography retains anions using positively charged functional group:

$$\text{R-X}^+\text{A}^-\,+\, \text{M}^+ \, \text{B}^- \rightleftarrows \,\text{R-X}^+\text{B}^- \,+\, \text{M}^+ \,+\, \text{A}^-$$

Note that the ion strength of either C+ or A− in the mobile phase can be adjusted to shift the equilibrium position, thus retention time.

The ion chromatogram shows a typical chromatogram obtained with an anion exchange column.

== Procedure ==
Before ion-exchange chromatography can be initiated, it must be equilibrated. The stationary phase must be equilibrated to certain requirements that depend on the experiment that you are working with. Once equilibrated, the charged ions in the stationary phase will be attached to its opposite charged exchangeable ions, such as Cl^{−} or Na^{+}. Next, a buffer should be chosen in which the desired protein can bind to. After equilibration, the column needs to be washed. The washing phase will help elute out all impurities that does not bind to the matrix while the protein of interest remains bounded. This sample buffer needs to have the same pH as the buffer used for equilibration to help bind the desired proteins. Uncharged proteins will be eluted out of the column at a similar speed of the buffer flowing through the column with no retention. Once the sample has been loaded onto to the column, and the column has been washed with the buffer to elute out all non-desired proteins, elution is carried out at specific conditions to elute the desired proteins that are bound to the matrix. Bound proteins are eluted out by utilizing a gradient of linearly increasing salt concentration. With increasing ionic strength of the buffer, the salt ions will compete with the desired proteins in order to bind to charged groups on the surface of the medium. This will cause desired proteins to be eluted out of the column. Proteins that have a low net charge will be eluted out first as the salt concentration increases causing the ionic strength to increase. Proteins with high net charge will need a higher ionic strength for them to be eluted out of the column.

It is possible to perform ion exchange chromatography in bulk, on thin layers of medium such as glass or plastic plates coated with a layer of the desired stationary phase, or in chromatography columns. Thin layer chromatography or column chromatography share similarities in that they both act within the same governing principles; there is constant and frequent exchange of molecules as the mobile phase travels along the stationary phase. It is not imperative to add the sample in minute volumes as the predetermined conditions for the exchange column have been chosen so that there will be strong interaction between the mobile and stationary phases. Furthermore, the mechanism of the elution process will cause a compartmentalization of the differing molecules based on their respective chemical characteristics. This phenomenon is due to an increase in salt concentrations at or near the top of the column, thereby displacing the molecules at that position, while molecules bound lower are released at a later point when the higher salt concentration reaches that area. These principles are the reasons that ion exchange chromatography is an excellent candidate for initial chromatography steps in a complex purification procedure as it can quickly yield small volumes of target molecules regardless of a greater starting volume.

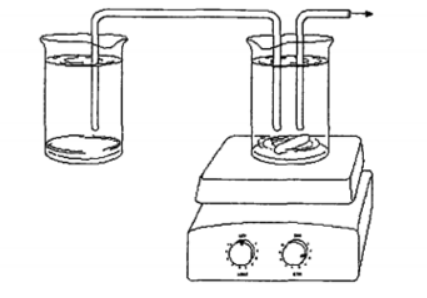
Chamber (left) contains high salt concentration. Stirred chamber (right) contains low salt concentration. Gradual stirring causes the formation of a salt gradient as salt travel from high to low concentrations.

Comparatively simple devices are often used to apply counterions of increasing gradient to a chromatography column. Counterions such as copper (II) are chosen most often for effectively separating peptides and amino acids through complex formation.

A simple device can be used to create a salt gradient. Elution buffer is consistently being drawn from the chamber into the mixing chamber, thereby altering its buffer concentration. Generally, the buffer placed into the chamber is usually of high initial concentration, whereas the buffer placed into the stirred chamber is usually of low concentration. As the high concentration buffer from the left chamber is mixed and drawn into the column, the buffer concentration of the stirred column gradually increase. Altering the shapes of the stirred chamber, as well as of the limit buffer, allows for the production of concave, linear, or convex gradients of counterion.

A multitude of different mediums are used for the stationary phase. Among the most common immobilized charged groups used are trimethylaminoethyl (TAM), triethylaminoethyl (TEAE), diethyl-2-hydroxypropylaminoethyl (QAE), aminoethyl (AE), diethylaminoethyl (DEAE), sulpho (S), sulphomethyl (SM), sulphopropyl (SP), carboxy (C), and carboxymethyl (CM).

Successful packing of the column is an important aspect of ion chromatography. Stability and efficiency of a final column depends on packing methods, solvent used, and factors that affect mechanical properties of the column. In contrast to early inefficient dry- packing methods, wet slurry packing, in which particles that are suspended in an appropriate solvent are delivered into a column under pressure, shows significant improvement. Three different approaches can be employed in performing wet slurry packing: the balanced density method (solvent's density is about that of porous silica particles), the high viscosity method (a solvent of high viscosity is used), and the low viscosity slurry method (performed with low viscosity solvents).

Polystyrene is used as a medium for ion-exchange. It is made from the polymerization of styrene with the use of divinylbenzene and benzoyl peroxide. Such exchangers form hydrophobic interactions with proteins which can be irreversible. Due to this property, polystyrene ion exchangers are not suitable for protein separation. They are used on the other hand for the separation of small molecules in amino acid separation and removal of salt from water. Polystyrene ion exchangers with large pores can be used for the separation of protein but must be coated with a hydrophilic substance.

Cellulose based medium can be used for the separation of large molecules because they contain large pores. Protein binding in this medium is high and has low hydrophobic character. DEAE is an anion exchange matrix that is produced from a positive side group of diethylaminoethyl bound to cellulose or Sephadex.

Agarose gel based medium contain large pores as well but their substitution ability is lower in comparison to dextrans. The ability of the medium to swell in liquid is based on the cross-linking of these substances, the pH and the ion concentrations of the buffers used.

Incorporation of high temperature and pressure allows a significant increase in the efficiency of ion chromatography, along with a decrease in time. Temperature has an influence of selectivity due to its effects on retention properties. The retention factor (k = (t_{R}^{g} − t_{M}^{g})/(t_{M}^{g} − t_{ext})) increases with temperature for small ions, and the opposite trend is observed for larger ions.

Despite ion selectivity in different mediums, further research is being done to perform ion exchange chromatography through the range of 40–175 °C.

An appropriate solvent can be chosen based on observations of how column particles behave in a solvent. Using an optical microscope, one can easily distinguish a desirable dispersed state of slurry from aggregated particles.

== Weak and strong ion exchangers ==
A "strong" ion exchanger will not lose the charge on its matrix once the column is equilibrated and so a wide range of pH buffers can be used. "Weak" ion exchangers have a range of pH values in which they will maintain their charge. If the pH of the buffer used for a weak ion exchange column goes out of the capacity range of the matrix, the column will lose its charge distribution and the molecule of interest may be lost. Despite the smaller pH range of weak ion exchangers, they are often used over strong ion exchangers due to their having greater specificity. In some experiments, the retention times of weak ion exchangers are just long enough to obtain desired data at a high specificity.

Resins (often termed 'beads') of ion exchange columns may include functional groups such as weak/strong acids and weak/strong bases. There are also special columns that have resins with amphoteric functional groups that can exchange both cations and anions. Some examples of functional groups of strong ion exchange resins are quaternary ammonium cation (Q), which is an anion exchanger, and sulfonic acid (S, -SO_{2}OH), which is a cation exchanger. These types of exchangers can maintain their charge density over a pH range of 0–14. Examples of functional groups of Weak ion exchange resins include diethylaminoethyl (DEAE, -C_{2}H_{4}N(C_{2}H_{5})_{2}), which is an anion exchanger, and carboxymethyl (CM, -CH_{2}-COOH), which is a cation exchanger. These two types of exchangers can maintain the charge density of their columns over a pH range of 5–9.

In ion chromatography, the interaction of the solute ions and the stationary phase based on their charges determines which ions will bind and to what degree. When the stationary phase features positive groups which attracts anions, it is called an anion exchanger; when there are negative groups on the stationary phase, cations are attracted and it is a cation exchanger. The attraction between ions and stationary phase also depends on the resin, organic particles used as ion exchangers.

Each resin features relative selectivity which varies based on the solute ions present who will compete to bind to the resin group on the stationary phase. The selectivity coefficient, the equivalent to the equilibrium constant, is determined via a ratio of the concentrations between the resin and each ion, however, the general trend is that ion exchangers prefer binding to the ion with a higher charge, smaller hydrated radius, and higher polarizability, or the ability for the electron cloud of an ion to be disrupted by other charges. Despite this selectivity, excess amounts of an ion with a lower selectivity introduced to the column would cause the lesser ion to bind more to the stationary phase as the selectivity coefficient allows fluctuations in the binding reaction that takes place during ion exchange chromatography.

Following table shows the commonly used ion exchangers.

Sr. No	Name	Type	Functional group
1	DEAE Cellulose (Anion exchanger)	Weakly basic	DEAE (Diethylaminoethyl)
2	QAE Sephadex (Anion exchanger)	Strongly basic	QAE (Quaternary aminoethyl)
3	Q Sepharose (Anion exchanger)	Strongly basic	Q (Quaternary ammonium)
4	CM- Cellulose (Cation exchanger)	Weakly acidic	CM (Carboxymethyl)
5	SP Sepharose (Cation exchanger)	Strongly acidic	SP (Sulfopropyl)
6	SOURCE S (Cation exchanger)	Strongly acidic	S (Methyl sulfate)

== Typical technique ==
A sample is introduced, either manually or with an autosampler, into a sample loop of known volume. A buffered aqueous solution known as the mobile phase carries the sample from the loop onto a column that contains some form of stationary phase material. This is typically a resin or gel matrix consisting of agarose or cellulose beads with covalently bonded charged functional groups. Equilibration of the stationary phase is needed in order to obtain the desired charge of the column. If the column is not properly equilibrated the desired molecule may not bind strongly to the column. The target analytes (anions or cations) are retained on the stationary phase but can be eluted by increasing the concentration of a similarly charged species that displaces the analyte ions from the stationary phase. For example, in cation exchange chromatography, the positively charged analyte can be displaced by adding positively charged sodium ions. The analytes of interest must then be detected by some means, typically by conductivity or UV/visible light absorbance.

Control an IC system usually requires a chromatography data system (CDS). In addition to IC systems, some of these CDSs can also control gas chromatography (GC) and HPLC.

== Membrane exchange chromatography ==
A type of ion exchange chromatography, membrane exchange is a relatively new method of purification designed to overcome limitations of using columns packed with beads. Membrane Chromatographic devices are cheap to mass-produce and disposable unlike other chromatography devices that require maintenance and time to revalidate. There are three types of membrane absorbers that are typically used when separating substances. The three types are flat sheet, hollow fibre, and radial flow. The most common absorber and best suited for membrane chromatography is multiple flat sheets because it has more absorbent volume. It can be used to overcome mass transfer limitations and pressure drop, making it especially useful for isolating and purifying viruses, plasmid DNA, and other large macromolecules. The column is packed with microporous membranes with internal pores which contain adsorptive moieties that can bind the target protein. Adsorptive membranes are available in a variety of geometries and chemistry which allows them to be used for purification and also fractionation, concentration, and clarification in an efficiency that is 10 fold that of using beads. Membranes can be prepared through isolation of the membrane itself, where membranes are cut into squares and immobilized. A more recent method involved the use of live cells that are attached to a support membrane and are used for identification and clarification of signaling molecules.

== Separating proteins ==
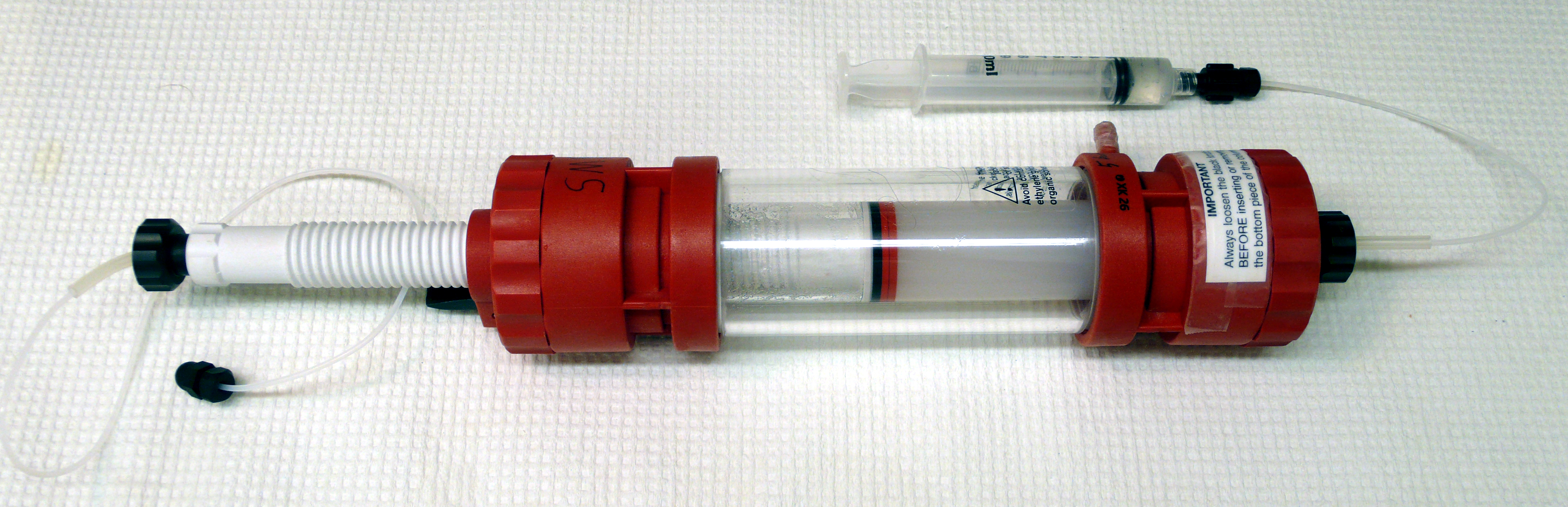
Preparative-scale ion exchange column used for protein purification

Ion exchange chromatography can be used to separate proteins because they contain charged functional groups. The ions of interest (in this case charged proteins) are exchanged for another ions (usually H^{+}) on a charged solid support. The solutes are most commonly in a liquid phase, which tends to be water. Take for example proteins in water, which would be a liquid phase that is passed through a column. The column is commonly known as the solid phase since it is filled with porous synthetic particles that are of a particular charge. These porous particles are also referred to as beads, may be aminated (containing amino groups) or have metal ions in order to have a charge. The column can be prepared using porous polymers, for macromolecules of a mass of over 100 000 Da, the optimum size of the porous particle is about 1 μm^{2}. This is because slow diffusion of the solutes within the pores does not restrict the separation quality. The beads containing positively charged groups, which attract the negatively charged proteins, are commonly referred to as anion exchange resins. The amino acids that have negatively charged side chains at pH 7 (pH of water) are glutamate and aspartate. The beads that are negatively charged are called cation exchange resins, as positively charged proteins will be attracted. The amino acids that have positively charged side chains at pH 7 are lysine, histidine and arginine.

The isoelectric point is the pH at which a compound—in this case a protein—has no net charge. A protein's isoelectric point or PI can be determined using the pKa of the side chains, if the amino (positive chain) is able to cancel out the carboxyl (negative) chain, the protein would be at its PI. Using buffers instead of water for proteins that do not have a charge at pH 7 is a good idea as it enables the manipulation of pH to alter ionic interactions between the proteins and the beads. Weakly acidic or basic side chains are able to have a charge if the pH is high or low enough respectively. Separation can be achieved based on the natural isoelectric point of the protein. Alternatively a peptide tag can be genetically added to the protein to give the protein an isoelectric point away from most natural proteins (e.g., 6 arginines for binding to a cation-exchange resin or 6 glutamates for binding to an anion-exchange resin such as DEAE-Sepharose).

Elution by increasing ionic strength of the mobile phase is more subtle. It works because ions from the mobile phase interact with the immobilized ions on the stationary phase, thus "shielding" the stationary phase from the protein, and letting the protein elute.

Elution from ion-exchange columns can be sensitive to changes of a single charge- chromatofocusing. Ion-exchange chromatography is also useful in the isolation of specific multimeric protein assemblies, allowing purification of specific complexes according to both the number and the position of charged peptide tags.

=== Gibbs–Donnan effect ===
In ion exchange chromatography, the Gibbs–Donnan effect is observed when the pH of the applied buffer and the ion exchanger differ, even up to one pH unit. For example, in anion-exchange columns, the ion exchangers repeal protons so the pH of the buffer near the column differs is higher than the rest of the solvent. As a result, an experimenter has to be careful that the protein(s) of interest is stable and properly charged in the "actual" pH.

This effect comes as a result of two similarly charged particles, one from the resin and one from the solution, failing to distribute properly between the two sides; there is a selective uptake of one ion over another. For example, in a sulphonated polystyrene resin, a cation exchange resin, the chlorine ion of a hydrochloric acid buffer should equilibrate into the resin. However, since the concentration of the sulphonic acid in the resin is high, the hydrogen of HCl has no tendency to enter the column. This, combined with the need of electroneutrality, leads to a minimum amount of hydrogen and chlorine entering the resin.

== Uses ==
=== Clinical utility ===
A use of ion chromatography can be seen in argentation chromatography. Usually, silver and compounds containing acetylenic and ethylenic bonds have very weak interactions. This phenomenon has been widely tested on olefin compounds. The ion complexes the olefins make with silver ions are weak and made based on the overlapping of pi, sigma, and d orbitals and available electrons therefore cause no real changes in the double bond. This behavior was manipulated to separate lipids, mainly fatty acids from mixtures in to fractions with differing number of double bonds using silver ions. The ion resins were impregnated with silver ions, which were then exposed to various acids (silicic acid) to elute fatty acids of different characteristics.

Detection limits as low as 1 μM can be obtained for alkali metal ions. It may be used for measurement of HbA1c, porphyrin and with water purification. Ion Exchange Resins(IER) have been widely used especially in medicines due to its high capacity and the uncomplicated system of the separation process. One of the synthetic uses is to use Ion Exchange Resins for kidney dialysis. This method is used to separate the blood elements by using the cellulose membraned artificial kidney.

Another clinical application of ion chromatography is in the rapid anion exchange chromatography technique used to separate creatine kinase (CK) isoenzymes from human serum and tissue sourced in autopsy material (mostly CK rich tissues were used such as cardiac muscle and brain). These isoenzymes include MM, MB, and BB, which all carry out the same function given different amino acid sequences. The functions of these isoenzymes are to convert creatine, using ATP, into phosphocreatine expelling ADP. Mini columns were filled with DEAE-Sephadex A-50 and further eluted with tris- buffer sodium chloride at various concentrations (each concentration was chosen advantageously to manipulate elution). Human tissue extract was inserted in columns for separation. All fractions were analyzed to see total CK activity and it was found that each source of CK isoenzymes had characteristic isoenzymes found within. Firstly, CK- MM was eluted, then CK-MB, followed by CK-BB. Therefore, the isoenzymes found in each sample could be used to identify the source, as they were tissue specific.

Using the information from results, correlation could be made about the diagnosis of patients and the kind of CK isoenzymes found in most abundant activity. From the finding, about 35 out of 71 patients studied suffered from heart attack (myocardial infarction) also contained an abundant amount of the CK-MM and CK-MB isoenzymes. Findings further show that many other diagnosis including renal failure, cerebrovascular disease, and pulmonary disease were only found to have the CK-MM isoenzyme and no other isoenzyme. The results from this study indicate correlations between various diseases and the CK isoenzymes found which confirms previous test results using various techniques. Studies about CK-MB found in heart attack victims have expanded since this study and application of ion chromatography.

=== Industrial applications ===
Since 1975, ion chromatography has been widely used in many branches of industry. The main advantages are reliability, very good accuracy and precision, high selectivity, high speed, high separation efficiency, and low cost of consumables. The most significant development related to ion chromatography are new sample preparation methods; improving the speed and selectivity of analytes separation; lowering of limits of detection and limits of quantification; extending the scope of applications; development of new standard methods; miniaturization and extending the scope of the analysis of a new group of substances. Allows for quantitative testing of electrolyte and proprietary additives of electroplating baths. It is an advancement of qualitative hull cell testing or less accurate UV testing. Ions, catalysts, brighteners and accelerators can be measured. Ion exchange chromatography has gradually become a widely known, universal technique for the detection of both anionic and cationic species. Applications for such purposes have been developed, or are under development, for a variety of fields of interest, and in particular, the pharmaceutical industry. The usage of ion exchange chromatography in pharmaceuticals has increased in recent years, and in 2006, a chapter on ion exchange chromatography was officially added to the United States Pharmacopia-National Formulary (USP-NF). Furthermore, in 2009 release of the USP-NF, the United States Pharmacopia made several analyses of ion chromatography available using two techniques: conductivity detection, as well as pulse amperometric detection. Majority of these applications are primarily used for measuring and analyzing residual limits in pharmaceuticals, including detecting the limits of oxalate, iodide, sulfate, sulfamate, phosphate, as well as various electrolytes including potassium, and sodium. In total, the 2009 edition of the USP-NF officially released twenty eight methods of detection for the analysis of active compounds, or components of active compounds, using either conductivity detection or pulse amperometric detection.

=== Drug development ===
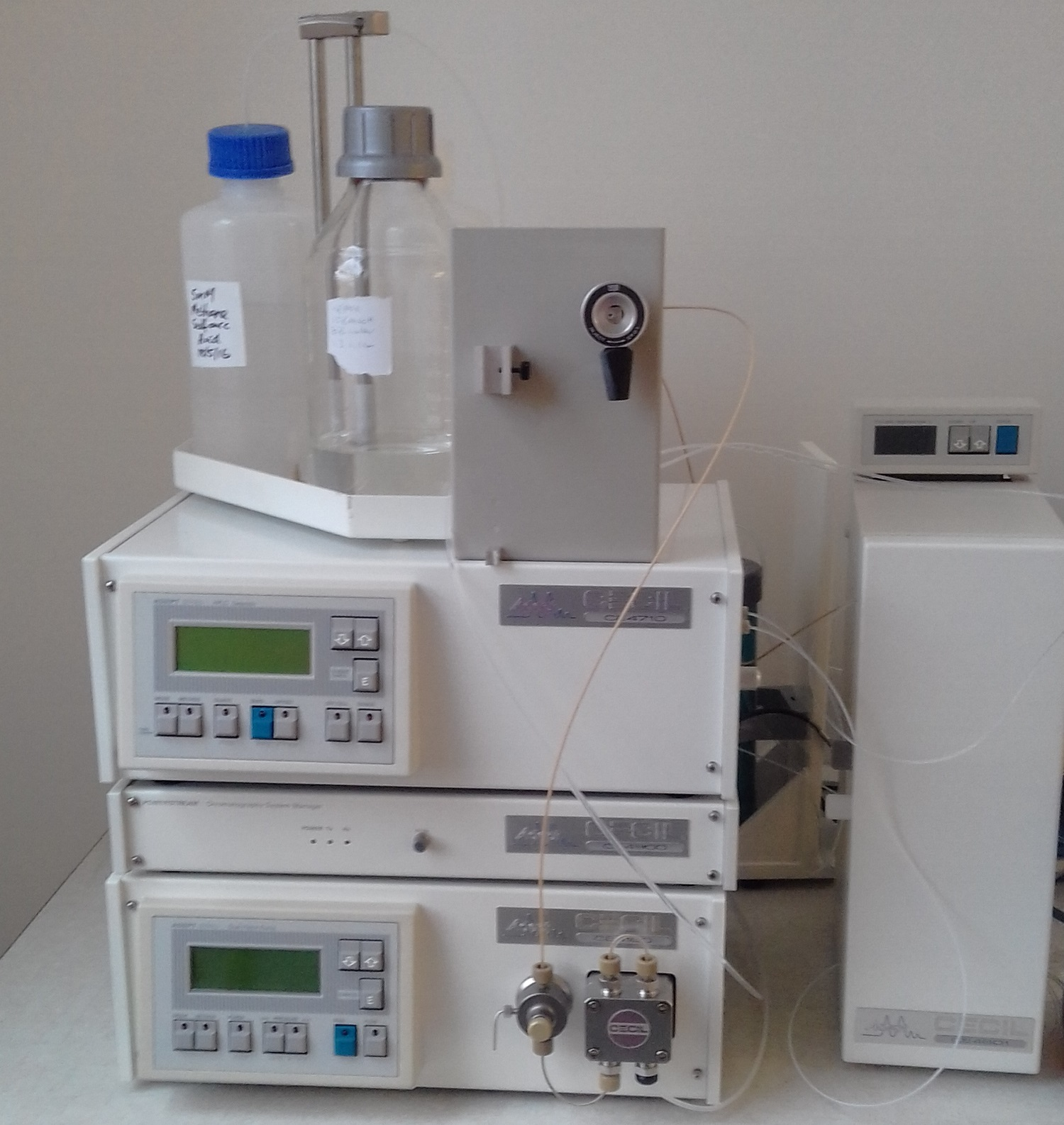
An ion chromatography system used to detect and measure cations such as sodium, ammonium and potassium in Expectorant Cough Formulations

There has been a growing interest in the application of ion chromatography in the analysis of pharmaceutical drugs. Ion chromatography is used in different aspects of product development and quality control testing. For example, ion chromatography is used to improve stabilities and solubility properties of pharmaceutical active drugs molecules as well as used to detect systems that have higher tolerance for organic solvents. Ion chromatography has been used for the determination of analytes as a part of a dissolution test. For instance, calcium dissolution tests have shown that other ions present in the medium can be well resolved among themselves and also from the calcium ion. Therefore, ion chromatography has been employed in drugs in the form of tablets and capsules in order to determine the amount of drug dissolve with time. Ion chromatography is also widely used for detection and quantification of excipients or inactive ingredients used in pharmaceutical formulations. Detection of sugar and sugar alcohol in such formulations through ion chromatography has been done due to these polar groups getting resolved in ion column. Ion chromatography methodology also established in analysis of impurities in drug substances and products. Impurities or any components that are not part of the drug chemical entity are evaluated and they give insights about the maximum and minimum amounts of drug that should be administered in a patient per day.

== See also ==
- Anion-exchange chromatography
- Chromatofocusing
- High-performance liquid chromatography
- Isoelectric point

== Bibliography ==
- Small, Hamish (1989). Ion chromatography. New York: Plenum Press. ISBN 978-0-306-43290-3.
- Tatjana Weiss; Weiss, Joachim (2005). Handbook of Ion Chromatography. Weinheim: Wiley-VCH. ISBN 978-3-527-28701-7.
- Gjerde, Douglas T.; Fritz, James S. (2000). Ion Chromatography. Weinheim: Wiley-VCH. ISBN 978-3-527-29914-0.
- Jackson, Peter; Haddad, Paul R. (1990). Ion chromatography: principles and applications. Amsterdam: Elsevier. ISBN 978-0-444-88232-5.
- Mercer, Donald W (1974). "Separation of tissue and serum creatine kinase isoenzymes by ion-exchange column chromatography". Clinical Chemistry. 20 (1): 36–40. doi:10.1093/clinchem/20.1.36. PMID 4809470.
- Morris, L. J. (1966). "Separations of lipids by silver ion chromatography". Journal of Lipid Research. 7 (6): 717–732. doi:10.1016/S0022-2275(20)38948-3. PMID 5339485.
- Ghosh, Raja (2002). "Protein separation using membrane chromatography: opportunities and challenges". Journal of Chromatography A. 952 (1): 13–27. doi:10.1016/s0021-9673(02)00057-2. PMID 12064524.
