= Elution =

Extraction of a material by washing with a solvent

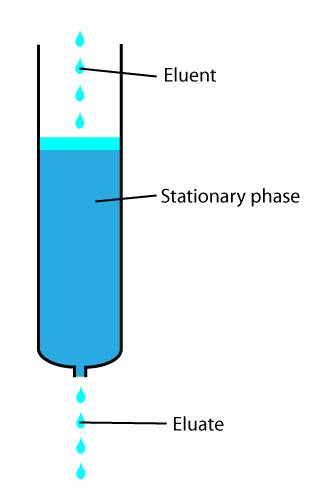
Elution principle of column chromatography

In analytical and organic chemistry, elution is the process of extracting one material from another by washing with a solvent: washing of loaded ion-exchange resins to remove captured ions, or eluting proteins or other biopolymers from an electrophoresis or chromatography column.

In a liquid chromatography experiment, for example, an analyte is generally adsorbed by ("bound to") an adsorbent in a liquid chromatography column. The adsorbent, a solid phase, called a "stationary phase", is a powder which is coated onto a solid support. Based on an adsorbent's composition, it can have varying affinities to "hold onto" other molecules—forming a thin film on the surface of its particles. Elution then is the process of removing analytes from the adsorbent by running a solvent, called an eluent, past the adsorbent–analyte complex. As the solvent molecules "elute", or travel down through the chromatography column, they can either pass by the adsorbent–analyte complex or displace the analyte by binding to the adsorbent in its place. After the solvent molecules displace the analyte, the analyte can be carried out of the column for analysis. This is why as the mobile phase, called an eluate, passes out of the column, it typically flows into a detector or is collected by a fraction collector for compositional analysis.

The rate of elution depends on many factors, including the eluent, the stationary phase, the analyte, the pH value, the temperature, etc. Predicting and controlling the elution rates of the analytes is a key aspect of column chromatographic and column electrophoretic methods.

== Definitions ==
The eluent or eluant is the "carrier" portion of the mobile phase. It moves the analytes through the chromatograph. In liquid chromatography, the eluent is the liquid solvent; in gas chromatography, it is the carrier gas.

The eluate contains the analyte material that emerges from the chromatograph. It specifically includes both the analytes and coeluting solutes passing through the column, while the eluent is only the carrier.

The elution time of a solute is the time between the start of the separation (the time at which the solute enters the column) and the time at which the solute elutes.

The elution volume is the volume of eluent required to cause elution. The elution volume may be enough information to identify solutes under standard conditions for a known mix of solutes in a certain technique. For instance, a mixture of amino acids may be separated by ion-exchange chromatography. Under a particular set of conditions, the amino acids will elute in the same order and at the same elution volume.

== Eluotropic series ==
An eluotropic series is a list of solvents ordered by their eluting power relative to a fixed adsorbent and a fixed analyte. The "eluting power" of a solvent is largely a measure of how well the solvent can "pull" an analyte off the adsorbent to which it is attached. This often happens when the eluent itself adsorbs onto the stationary phase, displacing the analyte. Such series are useful for determining necessary solvents needed for chromatography of chemical compounds.

In general, when the adsorbent is polar (as in normal-phase liquid chromatography), the non-polar solvents such as n-hexane have low eluting power, and polar solvents such as ethanol, methanol or water have high eluting power.

Adsorption strength (least strongly adsorbed → most strongly adsorbed)
Saturated hydrocarbons; alkyl halides	Unsaturated hydrocarbons; alkenyl halides	Aromatic hydrocarbons; aryl halides	Polyhalogenated hydrocarbons	Ethers	Esters	Aldehydes and ketones	Alcohols	Acids and bases (amines)

Eluting power (least eluting power → greatest eluting power)
Hexane or pentane	Cyclohexane	Benzene	Dichloromethane	Chloroform	Ether (anhydrous)	Ethyl acetate (anhydrous)	Acetone (anhydrous)	Methanol	Ethanol	Pyridine	Acetic acid	Water

== Antibody elution ==
Antibody elution is the process of removing antibodies that are attached to their targets, such as the surface of red blood cells. Techniques include using heat, a freeze-thaw cycle, ultrasound, acids, or organic solvents.

== See also ==
- Chromatography
- Desorption
- Electroelution
- Gradient elution in high performance liquid chromatography
- Leaching
