= Stabilized liquid membrane device =

Water sampling instrument

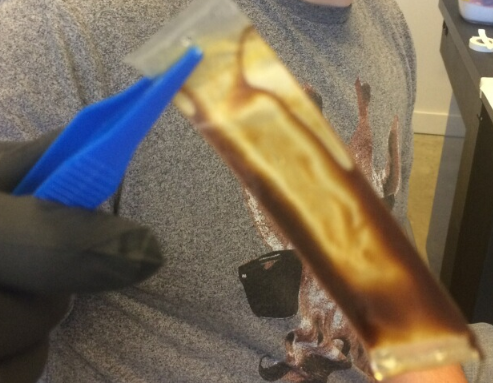
Researcher holding SLMD

A stabilized liquid membrane device (SLMD) is a type of passive sampling device which allows for the in situ, integrative collection of waterborne, labile ionic metal contaminants. By capturing and sequestering metal ions onto its surface continuously over a period of days to weeks, an SLMD can provide an integrative measurement of bioavailable toxic metal ions present in the aqueous environment. As such, they have been used in conjunction with other passive samplers in ecological field studies.

The simple device is composed of nonporous low-density plastic lay-flat tubing, which is filled with a chemical mixture containing a chelating agent (metal-binding agent) and a long chain organic acid. The water-insoluble chelating agent-organic acid mixture diffuses in a controlled manner to the exterior surface of the sampler membrane and binds to environmental metals. In practice, the SLMD provides for continuous sequestration of bioavailable forms of trace metals, such as, cadmium (Cd), cobalt (Co), copper (Cu), nickel (Ni), lead (Pb), and zinc (Zn). The SLMD can also be utilized for in-laboratory preconcentration and speciation of bioavailable trace metals from grab water samples.

== Background ==
Passive samplers were first developed in the early 1970s to monitor concentrations of airborne contaminants industrial workers might be exposed to, but by the 1990s researchers had developed and utilized passive samplers to monitor contaminants in the aqueous environment. The first type of passive sampler made for use in the aqueous environment was the semipermeable membrane device (SPMD). SPMDs could be used to determine time-weighted average concentrations of hydrophobic organic contaminants, but until the early 2000s passive sampling devices for metal contaminants had not yet emerged.

Metals in the environment can speciate into different forms. Most metals dissolved in the aqueous environment are present as any of several ionic, complex-ion, and organically bound states. For most toxic metals, bioavailability is greatest for labile metals in their free ionic state. Recognizing the potential usefulness of a passive sampling device that could be used to measure trace amounts of bioavailable toxic metals, researchers at the United States Geological Survey (USGS) and University of Missouri began development on a counterpart to SPMDs that could be used to sample for labile metals.

== Structure and function ==
The outer portion of an SLMD consists of a section of sealed, flat, semi-permeable polyethylene tubing. Sealed inside this tubing is a 1:1 mixture of a hydrophobic metal complexing agent and a long chain organic acid. The organic acid diffuses through the tubing to the outer surface, where the carboxylic acid portion can form stable complexes with calcium and magnesium ions in the water. This allows a waxy layer to slowly accumulate on the outside of the tube. The metal complexing agent continuously mobilizes into this waxy layer, where it can sequester metal ions from the water. The hydrophobic metal complexing agent most commonly used in SLMDs is an alkylated 8-hydroxyquinoline. Oleic acid is commonly used as the other half of the 1:1 hydrophobic reagent mixture, as it readily forms calcium oleates in the aqueous sampling media. In addition to the base device, hydrophobic plastic sheaths are sometimes used to house SLMDs in the field. Variable water flow can alter the sampling rates of metals by SLMDs, making a time-averaged concentration difficult to determine. By allowing labile metal analytes to diffuse to the SLMD's surface while limiting the diffusion of particulate, colloidal, or humic substances, these hydrophobic sheaths help reduce variability of SLMD uptake in faster moving waters.

After being deployed for a known time interval, SLMDs can be recovered from the field for analysis. Washing with 20% nitric acid allows for the extraction of accumulated metals, and by using analytical techniques like inductively coupled plasma mass spectroscopy (ICP-MS) or atomic absorption spectroscopy (flame AAS) to measure the concentration of metal in the extract, the amount of metal accumulated by the SLMD can be determined.

The simple device can be created in the laboratory using a nonporous polymeric tube, such as low-density polyethylene (LDPE) plastic. A sequestration medium within the tube slowly diffuses through the membrane, binding to ionic metals creating non-mobile metals species that can later be extracted from the other membrane. The sequestration medium generally consists of a metal binding agent, or chelating agent, and a long chain organic acid, commonly oleic acid.

The SLMD tube is flat with a membrane thickness that can vary between 2 and 500 μm depending on the application. The approximate width of the SLMD is 2.5 cm and approximate length is 15 cm (these dimensions may vary based on application). The sequestration medium reagent is typically composed of an equal mixture of oleic acid (cis-9-octadecenoic acid) and Kelex-100 (ethyl-methyl-octyl, 8-quinolinol), however other chemicals may be used to perform similar functions.

After deployment, the immobilized metal species can then be extracted from the outer membrane. The metal species can be identified and analyzed using widely recognized standard techniques (e.g., digestion, atomic absorption spectroscopy, inductively coupled plasma mass spectrometry, etc.). In this regard, any procedure or analytical technique applicable to measuring ionic or complexed metal species is suitable for determining metal concentrations sequestered by the SLMD.

== Applications ==
SLMDs are known to accumulate cadmium, cobalt, copper, nickel, lead, and zinc, and have been deployed in freshwater monitoring studies by The Washington State Department of Ecology (Ecology) and the USGS.

Ecology deployed SLMDs in upper and lower Indian Creek for 28 and 27 days respectively. Metal concentrations on the SLMDs were used to estimate the true concentration of metals in the creek. The estimated concentration was expressed as a range based on sampling rate of SLMDs as well as the length of exposure. The purpose of the sampling was to investigate potential causes of sublethal effects of young trout and loss of benthic biodiversity in the creek.

=== Environmental metal toxicology ===
Exposure to ionic metals has been shown to result in deleterious effects for aquatic organisms and may induce oxidative stress, cause DNA damage, and decrease enzyme activity. In contrast, some metals under certain environmental conditions have potential moderating effects on other more toxic metals; one example being zinc (Zn), which has been shown to reduce copper (Cu) toxicity when both metals are present. Given that the presence of particular aqueous metals may have a wide array of effects on organisms, aquatic toxicologists have developed various methods for sampling them.

Passive, or in situ, environmental sampling is an important tool used by toxicologists for evaluating toxicants that may exist in very small concentrations—not easily detectable via grab samples. One passive sampler, the semipermeable membrane device, or SPMD, is commonly used to measure organic contaminants in aquatic ecosystems. The SLMD was developed as a counterpart device for sampling metals. Passive sampling for trace metals is more complex than for organic toxicants as most dissolved metals can simultaneously exist in any of several ionic, complex-ion, and organically bound states. Metals can also bind with suspended or dissolved organic matter and exist as ultra-fine colloids, or lipophilic complexes.

First developed by Petty, Brumbaugh, Huckins, May, and Wiedmeyer, the SLMD is used to monitor ionic metals in aquatic environments. Due to anthropogenic factors such as mining, metal refining, and industrial activity, global emissions of metals has significantly increased within the last 100 years, and will likely continue to increase during the foreseeable future.

== Advantages and limitations ==
Toxic metals can be present in the aqueous environment at trace or ultra-trace concentrations, yet still be toxicologically significant and thus cause harm to humans or the environment. Because these concentrations are so low, they would fall beyond the detection limits of most analytical instruments if the media had been sampled using traditional grab samples. Using SLMDs to passively collect metals over an extended period of time allows for trace metals to accumulate to detectable levels, which can give more accurate estimate of aquatic chemistry and contamination. SLMDs also have the advantage of being able to capture pulses of metal contamination that might otherwise go undetected when using grab samples.

SLMDs are limited to the assessment of labile metals, and cannot be used to monitor for organic contaminants. Further, while the ability of SLMDs to sample copper, zinc, nickel, lead, and cadmium has been repeatedly demonstrated, there has been little laboratory research on their ability to reliably uptake other toxic metals. Still, while laboratory studies on the effectiveness of SLMDs have only investigated copper, zinc, nickel, lead, and cadmium, SLMDs have been used with success in field studies to assess a wider range of metals.

== See also ==
- Semipermeable membrane devices
- Polar organic chemical integrative sampler
- Diffusive gradients in thin films
- Chemcatcher
