= DGT =

DGT or dgt may refer to:

== Government ==
- Directorate-General for Translation, European Commission
- Directorate-General for Transport, European Commission
- Directorate General of Traffic, Spain
- Direction Générale du Travail, France

== Other uses ==
- Deansgate railway station, Manchester, England (station code)
- DGT board, a chessboard produced by the company Digital Game Technology
- Diffusive gradients in thin films technique, for detecting chemicals
- Discounted gift trust, in British law
- Ndra'ngith language, spoken in Australia (ISO 639-3:dgt)
- Davao Global Township, a business district in Mindanao, Philippines
- The IATA code of Sibulan Airport in Negros Oriental, Philippines
