= Grab bag =

Grab bag or Grabbag may refer to:

- The Grab Bag, L. M. Boyd's syndicated newspaper column
- Project Grab Bag, an American air sampling program to gather data about above-ground nuclear weapons testing in the Soviet Union
- "Grabbag" (song), the theme song of Duke Nukem 3D

== See also ==
- Marc's Grab Bag, a Canadian arts talk show television series that was aired from 1973 to 1974
