= Semipermeable membrane device =

Water chemical measurement tools

Semipermeable membrane devices (SPMD) are passive sampling devices used to monitor trace levels of organic compounds with a log Kow > 3. SPMDs are an effective way of monitoring the concentrations of chemicals from anthropogenic runoff and pollution in the marine environment because of their ability to detect minuscule levels of chemical. The data collected from a passive sampler is important for examining the amount of chemical in the environment and can therefore be used to formulate other scientific research about the effects of those chemicals on the organisms as well as the environment. Examples of chemicals commonly measured using SPMDs include: polycyclic aromatic hydrocarbons (PAHs), polychlorinated biphenyls (PCBs), polybrominated diphenyl ethers (PBDEs), dioxins, and furans, as well as hydrophobic waste-water effluents such as fragrances, triclosan, and phthalates.

Passive samplers may be used to monitor and record short-lived pulses of contaminants found in surface water that would otherwise be missed. SPMDs can accumulate contaminants from the water column because triolein (glyceryl trioleate) comprises the lipid membrane housed within the canister. However, they are most successful in accumulating trace chemicals in surface water with a calculable flow. The amount of chemical measured using an SPMD is related to the surface area of the sampling device. Therefore, using a larger SPMD increases the amount of chemical sampled.

== Deployment ==
SPMDs can be deployed within a wide range of water bodies, although flowing shallow water is preferable. These devices need to be secured to nearby structures to allow the SPMD to remain in a fixed position in its environment. To aid in the stability of SPMDs, various ways can be employed including attaching the device to a buoy system, an anchor, a boat, or structures/debris in shallow water. For the best possible data to be collected using passive samplers, some degree of stability and the ability of the SPMD to be stationary are required. As long as there are openings on the canister of the device, there is no particular way that the SPMD needs to be facing while deployed. Depending on the type of analysis that will be conducted, the extract of the sampler one or more may be needed to be deployed. SPMDs normally are deployed up to 30 days in the field, depending on how much accumulation of trace chemicals occurs in the passive sampler itself.

=== Flowing water ===
The advantage of deploying SPMDs into flowing water like streams or rivers is that these systems will increase the volume of water sampled. Areas of extremely high flow should be avoided however, as they present a danger to the integrity of the SPMD by way of floating debris (rocks, sediment or wood) and can move the device downstream. If the stream or river has suspended solids flowing through at regular intervals it may be advantageous for the device to be deployed with most of the openings facing away from the direction of flow. Placing the SPMD canister behind an obstacle in flowing water may also reduce the amount of suspended solids that interact with the device in these types of systems.

=== Lakes and oceans ===
The SPMD can be deployed in areas with low rates of flow or even in deep water areas. To ensure the safety and correct deployment of the SPMD within deep areas, it is important to attach the device to an anchor as well as a flotation device. To retrieve SPMDs from the field, a boat or a diver may be required, depending on the depth of the canister. An SPMD can concentrate chemicals from the water as well as the sediments in the water column, therefore it is important to know the composition of the sediment and benthic surface before deployment. To reduce interference from chemicals of unwanted sources, anchoring the SPMD at certain depths (e.g. higher for muddy sediments in aquatic systems) can be very beneficial.

=== Biological obstructions ===
==== Bio-films ====
Bio-films may grow on the canister which reduces the amount of contaminant collected due to membrane pores being covered.

==== Organisms ====
In marine systems a common problem involving barnacles growing on and in the canister can occur which can moderately to greatly reduce the amount of contaminant collected, as well as make it difficult to retrieve the devices.

== Advantages ==
The advantages of working with an SPMD passive sampler as opposed to a normal field test with an organism are that SPMDs are able to be deployed in extremely toxic waters that might be too toxic for an organism to live in or just not inhabited by sessile filter feeders. The design of the SPMD makes it so that it imitates the process of accumulating contaminants the way a mussel or oyster would, but without the issues of mortality or metabolizing any contaminants that may be present. They can also be deployed for a long period of time and can account for surge runoff events, chemical spills or other abnormal pollution events. The physical structure of a SPMD with its stainless steel covering protects it and allows it to be suspended on a sessile anchor in the water column. The main advantage of the SPMD over a different passive sampler called the polar organic chemical integrative sampler (POCIS) is that SPMDs will detect contaminants that have not fully dissolved in the water.

== Disadvantages ==
Although SPMDs have been around since the mid-1990s, they are still relatively new in the toxicology world and are still being studied as reliable forms of data collection. Because they are sessile, they don’t always paint an accurate picture of the environment because there are many organisms in the water that are mobile and can move away from contamination.

Since the SPMD is made of a low-density polyethylene membrane, it is transparent to UVa and UVb waves. And unfortunately, chemicals that are sensitive to light, like PAH’s, can degrade before correct concentrations are measured.

SPMDs are designed to accumulate low level concentrations of chemicals and those that are exposed to air for more than 30 minutes can concentrate airborne pollutants. Surface waters that are covered with oils or other layers must be disturbed, and the water cleared before the SPMD can be placed into the water otherwise false data collection will commence .

In addition, while an SPMD can account for surge events of contaminants, it is difficult to determine when this event took place during the sampling period because the SPMD does not track time . Another large disadvantage is that an SPMD will not be able to detect contaminants that readily dissolve in water, whereas a device like POCIS can.

== Applications ==
=== Data analysis ===
Two types of information are provided by passive samplers: the concentrations of contaminant inside the sampler and a predicted concentration of the contaminant in the water surrounding the sampler. The concentration of chemical inside the sampler is determined from SPMD dialysis, and the water concentration from a set of calculations based on the dialysis results and sampling methods.

The dialysis method starts with a thorough cleaning of the device to remove salts. It is then submerged in hexane and incubated for 18 to 24 hours. This process is done twice and the hexane from both dialysis periods is combined. The samples are then processed by an analytical chemistry lab to determine the content of the mixture.

As laid out by the USEPA, the dissolved concentration outside the sampler can be predicted by the following equation:

Cw = Cps/Kow *1000 [4]

Cw is the dissolved concentration in the water (in μg/L); Cps is the concentration of the contaminant in the SPMD (μg contaminant/g sampler); Kow is the phase-partitioning coefficient (L/kg); and 1000 is a multiplier to correct for a change in units. This equation is for general passive samplers, while a more defined equation includes the length of time the SPMD was monitoring:

Cw = Cspmd*Vspmd/ (Rs*t) [5]

Cw is the concentration of contaminant in the water; Cspmd is the concentration in the SPMD (usually ng/L); Vspmd is the volume of the SPMD (usually L); Rs is effective sampling rate (L/day); and t is the time of deployment (day).

=== Use by EPA ===
SPMDs are currently being used by the United States Environmental Protection Agency (EPA) as a tool to assess management strategies of contaminants in water and sediments. At a Superfund site in South Carolina, three versions of an SPMD was used at a superfund cleanup site to measure PCBs: one was kept in contact with surface sediments; a second suspended in the water-sediment interface; and a third in the water column. In June 2005, a Superfund site in North Providence, Rhode Island deployed SPMDs in six locations. They were set in the water column and sediment for a 27-day exposure to test for TCDD, furans, dioxins, and volatile organic compounds.
