= Direction Générale du Travail =

Department of the French government

The Direction Générale du Travail (DGT) is a department of the French government, attached to the Ministry of Labor. The DGT's mission is to coordinate and direct labor policy in order to improve collective and individual relations and working conditions in companies, as well as the quality and effectiveness of the law governing them.

== History ==
The Direction Générale du Travail et de la Main d'œuvre was created in 1946, then split into two departments, before being re-established on March 22, 1957. In 1964, it was renamed the Direction Générale du Travail et de l'Emploi.

A decree signed on June 25, 1975 introduced a new organizational structure, with the Labor Relations Department, the Employment Delegation and the Studies and Statistics Department.

A decree signed on August 22, 2006 created the Direction générale du Travail, replacing the Mission centrale d'appui et de coordination des services extérieurs du travail created in 1982, and the Direction des relations du travail.

== Missions ==
The Directorate General of Labor has authority over the decentralized departments, and is responsible for the application of Convention No. 81 of the International Labor Organization (ILO) of July 11, 1947 on labor inspection, as well as Convention No. 129 of June 25, 1969 on labor inspection in agriculture, Convention No. 178 of October 22, 1996 and regulations 5.1.4 to 5.1.6 of Title 5 of the Maritime Labor Convention 2006 on the inspection of working and living conditions of seafarers. In this capacity, it acts as the central authority, central body and central coordinating authority for labor inspectors, as provided for in these conventions. It has authority over labor inspection officers in the field of labor relations. It sets the terms of coordination between the various control units of the inspection system.

The Direction Générale du Travail

- determines labor policy guidelines, coordinates and evaluates actions, particularly in terms of labor law enforcement;
- contributes to defining the organizational principles of the territorial network;
- provides support and back-up to decentralized departments in the performance of their duties;
- ensures compliance with the code of ethics for labor inspectors;
- coordinates liaison with the labor inspection departments of other ministries;
- conducts specific inspection activities.

The public policies pursued by the DGT are relayed throughout France by the regional directorates for business, competition, consumer affairs, labor and employment.

The DGT also relies on a network of operators, such as the Agence nationale de sécurité sanitaire de l'alimentation, de l'environnement et du travail and the Agence nationale pour l'amélioration des conditions de travail, which it oversees.

Since 2002, the DGT has been based in a building on the Front-de-Seine, at 39-43 quai André-Citroën, the Mirabeau Tower (15th arrondissement).
