= Project Grab Bag =

US program monitoring Soviet Union nuclear weapons testing

For environmental monitoring, Project Grab Bag was an air sampling program conducted in the United States in the stratosphere of above-ground nuclear weapons testing in the Soviet Union.

The objective of the Grab Bag program was to develop an unmanned high-altitude balloon-borne system that would collect air samples at an altitude of typically 80,000 feet (24,000 m) and return them to earth for analyses. The air samples were analyzed for the presence of specific isotopes of krypton and xenon, unambiguous markers of fission reactions. These short-lived isotopes are created in the fission process and carried high into the atmosphere by the fireball, where they will remain for some days. The air sampling system was developed by the Balloons and Meteorological Systems group at General Mills, Inc. in Minneapolis, Minnesota, using large balloons fabricated of thin polyethylene film. The initial test of the sampling system collected an important air sample over the United States on August 14, 1953, at an altitude of 80,000 feet (24,000 m). This sample contained debris from a nuclear weapon test in the USSR, designated Joe-4, that was conducted two days earlier, on August 12, 1953, at Semipalatinsk in Kazakhstan. This was the first test of a thermonuclear weapon by the USSR and was initiated by a 40-kiloton uranium-235 bomb and produced a total yield of 400 kilotons.

== Background ==
The first nuclear detonation was an above-ground test, "Trinity", conducted in New Mexico on July 16, 1945. It represented an important accomplishment of the Manhattan Project that had been initiated at Los Alamos National Laboratory in 1943. In less than two months following this test, nuclear weapons assembled at Los Alamos were used in the Pacific War against Japan. Hiroshima was devastated on August 6, 1945, with a uranium-235 gun device with a fission product yield of about 15 kilotons. Three days later, on August 9, 1945, a plutonium-239 implosion device with a yield of about 22 kilotons was detonated over Nagasaki. These events significantly influenced the conclusion of World War II as the incredibly destructive power of these new weapons became apparent. The Manhattan Project brought together scientists from the US and Britain to collaborate on this nuclear weapons development program. Los Alamos was the epicenter of this activity, and, in spite of high-level security, it was realized in 1948 that security of the program had been breached. Klaus Fuchs, a British theoretical physicist intimately involved in some of the most sensitive aspects of the program, had supplied the USSR with key information via outside contacts beginning in 1945. This information substantially advanced the Soviet effort in developing nuclear weapons. As the US became aware of the loss of key ideas and design concepts, it was important to reassess the state of the Soviet program in fission devices, and to monitor extensions of their program to fusion devices. One concern was the extent of progress made by the Soviets in producing fissionable material through reactor operations. Of even greater importance was the state of development of fission–fusion devices capable of orders of magnitude greater destructive power than the fission devices used against Japan.

The detection of reactor operations and above-ground nuclear weapon tests can be carried out in various ways. One approach used since the early 1950s has been the analyses of air samples collected at ground and low-level altitudes for the presence of particular radioactive nuclides. This technique is still in use, and there are a number of ground-based, radionuclide detectors for airborne debris in continuous operation in various parts of the world. An advantage of collecting air samples in the stratosphere is that powerful above-ground nuclear explosions carry bomb debris to elevated altitudes, where it is broadly distributed by winds aloft. The collection and analyses of this debris can therefore provide direct and timely information about a particular test. This article briefly describes the successful effort to develop and implement a program of gathering air samples using high-altitude balloon systems that were used from 1953 until late in 1956. The high-altitude balloon program that collected these samples was known as Project Grab Bag.

The Balloon and Meteorological Systems Group of General Mills, Inc. (GMI) had developed, along with other organizations, constant-level balloon systems capable of reliably carrying instruments and other equipment high into the stratosphere for sustained periods. These systems were ideal platforms on which to conduct experiments related to the observation of winds aloft, cosmic ray studies, and a variety of other investigations. Early in 1953 the eventual sponsors of the Grab Bag program conveyed to the GMI team under the direction of Harold E. Froehlich, principal engineer of the Balloons and Meteorological Systems Group, that high-altitude air samples containing debris from USSR above-ground nuclear weapon tests would be important in monitoring progress in their nuclear weapons program. The sponsors did not discuss specific kinds of debris or isotopes that were of interest. Sizable air samples obtained at high altitude, for example 80,000 feet (24,000 m), were judged to be desirable, that is, samples of the order of 1,200 cubic feet (34 m^{3}) at standard temperature and pressure conditions. This meant that samples of approximately 33,000 cubic feet (930 m^{3}) would need to be collected at altitude. The sponsors also conveyed a sense of urgency in developing the capability to collect such samples. An important weapon test was expected to take place at the USSR test range in the latter part of the summer of 1953, in about six months. They also disclosed that two other US air sampling efforts were being developed and outlined those approaches using special high-altitude aircraft and sounding rockets. These approaches had limits in terms of the effective size of the air sample, and the balloon program offered the potential of being able to gather comparatively large air samples. The Grab Bag team began to develop the concept of suspending an uninflated envelope beneath a large helium-filled balloon, and carrying the envelope to high altitude and filling it with ambient air. An autopilot would then initiate the descent of the entire system. When the system had descended to about 10,000 feet (3,000 m) the air sample would be transferred from the envelope into an armored vessel that could withstand a variety of landing situations and protect the air sample from loss at the point of recovery. The balloon system would include an electronic controller and autopilot to carry out this sequence of events, and to return the entire system back to ground in a controlled descent. Simplified sketches of the grab bag system are illustrated in the three primary stages of flight in Figures 1-3: ascent of the system to the sampling altitude (Figure 1), collection of the air sample at high altitude (Figure 2), and recovery of the sample and descent of the system (Figure 3).

As shown schematically in Figure 1, a high-speed blower, the associated power supply and electronic control package was suspended from the base of the sample balloon, at the lowest point in the load train (#57). The base of the sample balloon was modified to take a cylindrical fitting (#40) that was fitted with the blower. The blower would operate at the ceiling altitude of 80,000 feet (24,000 m) for of the order of two hours to fill the sample balloon with about 33,000 cubic feet (930 m^{3}) of air. The inflated sample balloon is illustrated in Figure 2 at the conclusion of the sampling cycle. At this point, an autopilot would release a predetermined amount of helium from the lifting balloon and initiate the descent of the entire system at a rate of about 400 feet per minute. As the system descended to about 10,000 feet (3,000 m), an axial fan (#29) located at the top of the sample envelope would be activated to transfer the air sample into a flexible armored vessel (#27) located just above the sample balloon and below the lifting balloon and suspended parachute (#23). The transfer of the sample required a short period of time and then a valve at the base of the armored vessel (#29) was sealed. The system continued to descend and when the control unit contacted ground, explosive devices severed the connection between the lifting balloon and the parachute and this led to a collapse of the lifting balloon and conclusion of the flight. The Grab Bag concept resulted in a complex load train with electrical cables running along the entire length of the system, about 300 feet (91 m) in length. Launching of the system was a challenge to safely get this extended system off the ground, and to do so without damaging the lifting balloon, the sample envelope, electrical cables for the blowers, the autopilot and associated helium valve, antenna lines and other elements of the system.

The electronic control unit (#57) transmitted the altitude and key steps in the flight sequence, including:

- The initiation of a high-altitude blower for a programmable period (typically 90 minutes) to fill the sample envelope with ambient air.
- The initiation of the axial fan #25 (to transfer the air sample from the sample balloon into the armored vessel at an altitude of 10,000 feet).
- The initiation of an autopilot function #116 (to valve helium from the lifting balloon).
- The rate of descent of the system (typically 1000 to 2000 feet per minute).
- The arming of the explosive cut down devices #57 (to rapidly deflate the lifting balloon when the lowest part of the system contacted the ground).

A non-rigid armored vessel (#27) was designed that would withstand the rigors of most landings and preserve the air sample of approximately 1,000 cubic feet (28 m^{3}). It consisted of three nested cylinders of flexible materials that, from the outside to the inside, were: a tough outer layer of plasticized nylon; an intermediate layer of woven nylon with very high tear strength, and; an innermost cylinder of polyethylene film that would serve as a gas barrier for the air sample. At takeoff the armored vessel hung in a deflated form around the steel cable (#27) and below an open parachute (#23) that would provide braking of the system descent if the rate exceeded about 2000 feet per minute. Launching of this complex balloon system required special handling techniques, and the entire process was referred to as a platform launch, a novel concept developed by Harold E. Froehlich, principal engineer of the Balloons and Meteorological System Group. In this form of launching the load train, nearly 300 feet (91 m) in length, was laid out on a ground cloth-covered runway with the lowest part of the load train in the upwind direction. The uppermost part of the system, the top of the lifting balloon, would be in the downwind direction. A heavy platform was positioned at a point toward the top of the lifting balloon, and the balloon material would pass over the platform and be securely held in place by a large horizontal padded roller about four feet in length. The helium inflation tube was located in the upper portion of the lifting balloon so that the helium source would inflate the section of the balloon beyond the platform. Since the system would be ascending to 80,000 feet (24,000 m) in altitude, only about 3% of the maximum balloon volume was filled with helium. The inflation took place by metering in an amount of helium lifting gas that would equal the gross weight of the system plus typically about 5% of ‘free lift’ to ensure that the system would ascend at an appropriate rate at the launching.

Launching was initiated by releasing the padded roller on the launch platform. The ascending balloon would then sequentially pick up the lower part of the lifting balloon, the deployed parachute and armored vessel, the uninflated envelope, and lastly the heavy insulated bag containing the controller, blower, instruments, telemetering equipment and power supply. There were variations of this procedure that evolved to facilitate the launching. For example, the heavy instrument bag and blower assembly was eventually mounted on the front of a vehicle that drove under the balloon system as it ascended during launching, and the bag was released from the vehicle using small explosive devices.

Grab Bag flights were typically launched early in the morning and recovered during daylight hours of that same day. The ascent time to 80,000 feet (24,000 m) was usually about three hours. As the balloon system approached the ceiling altitude, the excess lift (referred to as "free lift") that drove the system upward on launching filled out a duct system of the lifting balloon, and helium was automatically vented from the lifting balloon and slowed the ascent. As this process continued, the balloon system slowly ascended to the ceiling altitude and was in equilibrium, the lift of the helium balloon just balancing the total weight of the system. If this process took place as designed, about thirty minutes were needed to assure that the system was stable at the ceiling altitude of 80,000 feet (24,000 m). If the system instruments indicated that the altitude was not changing, the blower attached to the sample envelope balloon at the base of the system was initiated by the controller. The effect of turning on the blower was almost immediately evident in the appearance of the sample balloon. Viewing the system through a tracking telescope clearly showed the sample envelope beginning to fill out. The sample gathering process typically required of the order of an hour or so to be completed, the appearance of the system then being of two balloons, one immediately on top of the other. The blower was then turned off by the controller and a valve closed that sealed the sample envelope from the outside. The autopilot was then activated by the controller, releasing helium from the lifting balloon (#116) and initiating a descent of the entire system. In practice, the descent of the system did not become apparent for of the order of an hour after the autopilot was activated. This was because the sample balloon, now containing a large volume of air, would generate lift with any descent due to adiabatic heating of the sample air in the isothermal stratosphere. It could require an hour or two to establish a nominal descent rate of the system. The descent to altitudes of the order of 15,000 feet (4,600 m) could take of the order of two to three hours. At this point the axial fan (#29) was automatically initiated to transfer air in the sample balloon into the armored vessel. This transfer was usually completed before the system reached an altitude of 4 or 5 thousand feet and a valve in the armored vessel valve just above the axial fan (#25) was sealed by the controller. As the system continued to descend and touched down, explosive cutters fired to release the lifting balloon from the lower part of the system and the armored vessel fell the short remaining distance, perhaps fifty feet, to the ground. Usually the recovery crew was at the landing site and immediately began the process of transferring the air sample from the armored vessel into high-pressure bottles for transfer to another laboratory for analyses.

A series of six test flights were carried out in the Grab Bag development program in which various system elements were examined. The seventh flight would be the first attempt to capture the first air sample at 80,000 feet (24,000 m) in the Minneapolis area in mid-August 1953. The six test flights carried out tests of various system components, and included: tests and further development of the launching procedure for this complex system; an evaluation of the system controller; adequacy of the power supply and the autopilot function; a study of the blower function at altitude to evaluate both its function and the volume of air delivered into the sample balloon as compared to the laboratory results; evaluation of the process in which the axial fan transferred the air sample from the sample balloon into the armored vessel and the vessel was sealed; and in each case, further development of logistics for system launching and recovery.

Fortunately, the first flight of the complete system occurred at a time that corresponded well with the above-ground test in the USSR. This first flight was successful and we were subsequently informed that the air sample provided information that was of vital interest to those assessing fission/fusion reactions and test activities around the world. We also learned that of the three approaches developed to capture air samples, the high-altitude balloon system was the only one to successfully accomplish this objective, and the sample was collected within the desired window of time. As before, there was no specific or definitive information. Photographs, films and notebooks further describing the development of the Grab Bag system and the platform launching process are contained in the archives of the International Balloon Museum, Albuquerque, New Mexico.

Some years later more information became available related to the fundamental observations that were being made of the air samples that were gathered in the Grab Bag program. This information was related to the presence and distribution of isotopes of inert gases, particularly isotopes of xenon and krypton. The fission of a nucleus produces two different nuclei, the mass of which nearly sums to the mass of the original nucleus. The fission of uranium or plutonium therefore produces a spectrum of different pairs of nuclei, generally in a bimodal mass distribution. The fission products will include isotopes of many elements and this includes the inert gases such as xenon and krypton. Some of the radioactive isotopes of these inert elements have half-lives or the order of days, and these isotopes have therefore decayed away and are not found in our solar system. However, a recent fission reaction such as in a reactor or in a nuclear explosion will produce small quantities of these radioactive isotopes. If they are detected in the atmosphere, their presence is evidence that a reactor has been operating, or that a recent nuclear detonation has taken place. This is the basis of the air sampling effort as a means for the detection and characterization of such activities.

As noted in the following table by Chien C. Lin, the isotopes of particular interest have short half-lives, so detection depends on sampling the atmosphere promptly following such operations. Note that the distribution and ratios of xenon isotopes can also be used to determine whether a particular detonation was of a uranium or plutonium device.

Half-lives
Isotope	Half-life	Plutonium-239 Fission	Uranium-235 Fission
Xe-133	5.25 days	6.98%	6.70%
Xe-133m	2.19 days	0.23%	0.19%
Xe-135	0.38 days	7.60%	6.54%

The explosion that was sampled by this first Grab Bag flight is known as Joe 4 and took place on August 12, 1953, at Semipalatinsk in Kazakhstan. It was a 40-kiloton uranium-235 bomb that ultimately produced a total yield of 400 kilotons. It was estimated that 15–20% of the energy was released by fusion (60–80 kilotons) and the rest was from fast fission.

The Grab Bag air sampling program was quickly expanded following the successful flight in August 1953, and there subsequently were more than two hundred Grab Bag flights launched during the subsequent two years. It was one of the largest programs that took place in the Balloon and Meteorological Systems organization at General Mills Inc. On February 19, 1963, U. S. Patent 3,077,779, for this high-altitude air sampling system was assigned to H. E. Froehlich, Roger A. Kizzek, Donald F. Melton, and Richard L. Schwoebel.
