= Discounted gift trust =

A Discounted Gift Trust (DGT) is a type of UK trust arrangement usually set up in connection with an investment in either an onshore or offshore investment bond (insurance bond). It allows the gifting of a lump sum into a trust whilst retaining a lifelong 'income' from that money (technically withdrawals of capital), with the overarching aim of reducing the eventual inheritance tax (IHT) bill on death.

The name Discounted Gift Trust was coined by the life insurance industry. In strict legal terms, it is a type of Carve Out Trust.

== Tax treatment ==
Provided the settlor (the person making the gift into the trust) is in reasonable health, a calculation is made as to the likely total amount of 'income' that will be paid back to them by the trustees. This "bag of rights", normally known as the "discount", is deemed to be retained by the settlor. The remainder will be treated like any other gift into trust (a chargeable transfer (CT) in the case of a discretionary trust, or a potentially exempt transfer (PET) for a bare trust), leaving the IHT net after 7 years (or 14 years in some cases).

In the event of the settlor dying within seven years, this retained "bag of rights" should in theory be returned to their personal representatives. However, the accepted IHT treatment, as has been tested many times and accepted by HM Revenue and Customs (HMRC), is that this right to an income for life has no value once the settlor has died, and therefore no money has to be returned.

The effect is that the discount is deemed to leave their estate on day one of settlement of monies into the trust- the remainder will be treated like any other gift into trust and brought back into calculations if death occurs within 7 (in some cases 14) years. In effect, there is an immediate IHT reduction upon creation of a discounted gift trust.

A discounted gift trust can be a robust planning tool for citizens wishing to draw income from previous investments throughout their lifetime, with the goal of passing on the remainder to their beneficiaries, as this type of trust helps to reduce the amount of Inheritance Tax that may be required to pay.

== Example ==
This is a simplified example:

Mr Smith gifts £100,000 into a discounted gift trust.

He selects £4,000 per year 'income' (withdrawals) for life.

Based on his age and gender and on HMRC guidelines (drafted with reference to mortality tables), his life expectancy is deemed to be 15 years.

£4,000 x 15 = £60,000 is the discount, or the amount of the gift which has technically been 'carved out' and retained (in reality this would be lowered a little to reflect the real cost of providing £4,000 over fifteen years assuming there is some return on capital held).

If he dies within seven years:

- The value of the "right to withdrawals for life", which started as £60,000, is now deemed to be nil (as he is dead). Thus, the £60,000 does not come back into play in the IHT calculation.

- The remaining £40,000 is brought back into the calculation for inheritance tax, reducing his nil rate band by this amount

Note - importantly - that Mr Smith will have no future access to any of the £100,000 capital - rather his only benefit will be the £4,000 per annum 'income'. Also, this 'income' is dependent on there being sufficient capital remaining in the investment so in this example 4% per annum net growth is needed just to stand still.
