= Diffusive gradients in thin films =

Environmental chemistry technique

The diffusive gradients in thin films (DGT) technique is an environmental chemistry technique for the detection of elements and compounds in aqueous environments, including natural waters, sediments and soils. It is well suited to in situ detection of bioavailable toxic trace metal contaminants. The technique involves using a specially designed passive sampler that houses a binding gel, diffusive gel and membrane filter. The element or compound passes through the membrane filter and diffusive gel and is assimilated by the binding gel in a rate-controlled manner. Post-deployment analysis of the binding gel can be used to determine the time-weighted-average bulk solution concentration of the element or compound via a simple equation.

According to DGT theory, the concentration of an analyte, [C], tends toward 0 (μg/L, ng/L, etc.) as the analyte approaches the binding layer, passing through the diffusive boundary layer (DBL, ẟ) and the DGT device's diffusive gel (thickness of Δg). No reverse diffusion of the analyte back into the solution is assumed to occur.

== History ==
The DGT technique was developed in 1994 by Hao Zhang and William Davison at the Lancaster Environment Centre of Lancaster University in the United Kingdom. The technique was first used to detect metal cations in marine environments using Chelex 100 as the binding agent. Further characterisation of DGT, including the results of field deployments in the Menai Strait and the North Atlantic Ocean, was published in 1995. The technique was first tested in soils in 1998, with results demonstrating that kinetics of dissociation of labile species in the porewater (soil solution) could be determined via DGT. Since then, the DGT technique has been modified and expanded to include a significant number of elements and compounds, including cationic metals, nitrate, phosphate and other oxyanions (V, Cr^{VI}, As, Se, Mo, Sb, W), antibiotics, bisphenols, and nanoparticles, and has even been modified for the geochemical exploration of gold. DGT has also been developed and calibrated for the measure of radionuclides, including for the analysis of actinides such as U, Pu, Am and Cm, both in the environment and even in cooling pools for spent nuclear fuel rods.

DGT Research Ltd. was established in July 1997 by the original developers of the technique, Profs. Davison and Zhang, and sells ready-made DGT® devices for water, soil and sediment deployments to measure different analytes, as well as the component parts for self-assembly. The company holds the original patents for the device and DGT® is a trademark which is registered throughout the world. In 2014 a rival company "EasySensor" was set up by Prof. Shiming Ding and supplies devices that the company claims are analogous to the original DGT® products.

== The DGT device ==
A photo of a disassembled DGT device, showing piston and cap. The device in this picture has been fitted with activated carbon for assimilating gold and/or bisphenols.

The most commonly used DGT device is a plastic "piston-type" probe, and comprises a cylindrical polycarbonate base and a tight-fitting, circular cap with an opening (DGT window). A binding gel, diffusive gel (typically a polyacrylamide hydrogel) and filter membrane are stacked onto the base, and the cap is used to seal the gel and filter layers inside Dimensions of the gel layers vary depending on features of the environment, such as the flow rate of water being sampled; an example is an approximately 2 cm device diameter containing a 1mm gel layer. Other commonly used probe configurations include those for deploying in sediments (to measure solute mobilisation with depth) and in planar form for measuring solute dynamics in the plant rhizosphere.

== Principles of operation ==
=== Deployment ===
DGT devices being deployed into groundwater in the Tanami Desert, Australia.

DGT devices can be directly deployed in aqueous environmental media, including natural waters, sediments, and soils. In fast-flowing waters, the DGT device's face should be perpendicular to the direction of flow, in order to ensure the diffusive boundary layer (DBL) is not affected by laminar flow. In slow-flowing or stagnant waters such as in ponds or groundwater, deployment of DGT devices with different thicknesses of diffusive gel can allow for the determination of the DBL and a more accurate determination of bulk concentration. Modifications to the diffusive gel (e.g. increasing or decreasing the thickness) can also be undertaken to ensure low detection limits.

=== Analysis of binding gels and chemical imaging ===
After the DGT devices/probes have been retrieved, the binding gels can be eluted using methods that depend on the target analyte and the DGT binding gel (for example, nitric acid can be used to elute most metal cations from Chelex-100 gels). NaOH can be used to elute most oxyanions from Zr-Oxide(Ding et al., 2010, 2011,2016; Sun et al.,2014).The eluent can then be quantitatively analysed via a range of analytical techniques, including but not limited to: ICP-MS, GFAAS ICP-OES, AAS, UV-Vis spectroscopy or computer imaging densitometry. For chemical imaging and to obtain two-dimensional (2D) sub-mm high resolution distribution of analytes in heterogenous environments, such as sediments and the rhizosphere, the retrieved gel strips can be analyzed by PIXE or LA-ICP-MS after gel drying.

== The DGT equation ==
DGT is based on the application of Fick's law. Once the mass of an analyte has been determined, the time-averaged concentration of the analyte in the bulk, $C_{DGT}$, can be determined by application of the following equation:

$$C_{DGT} = \frac {M \Delta g}{DtA}\$$

where $M$ is the mass of the analyte on the resin, $\Delta g$ is the combined thickness of the hydrogel layer and filter membrane (i.e. the "diffusion layer"). The previously determined diffusion coefficient of the analyte in the type of diffusion layer used and at the ambient temperature is represented by $D$, $t$ is the deployment time, and $A$ is the area of the DGT window. More elaborate analysis techniques may be required in cases where the ionic strength of the water is low and where significant organic matter is present.

== See also ==
- List of chemical analysis methods
- Environmental monitoring
- Chemcatcher
- Metrology
- Microanalysis
