= Polar organic chemical integrative sampler =

A polar organic chemical integrative sampler (POCIS) is a passive sampling device which allows for the in situ collection of a time-integrated average of hydrophilic organic contaminants developed by researchers with the United States Geological Survey in Columbia, Missouri. POCIS provides a means for estimating the toxicological significance of waterborne contaminants. The POCIS sampler mimics the respiratory exposure of organisms living in the aquatic environment and can provide an understanding of bioavailable contaminants present in the system. POCIS can be deployed in a wide range of aquatic environments and is commonly used to assist in environmental monitoring studies.

== Background ==
The first passive sampling devices were developed in the 1970s to determine concentrations of contaminants in the air. In 1980 this technology was first adapted for the monitoring of organic contaminants in water. The initial type of passive sampler developed for aquatic monitoring purposes was the semipermeable membrane device (SPMD). SPMD samplers are most effective at absorbing hydrophobic pollutants with an octanol-water partition coefficient (Kow) ranging from 4-8. As the global emission of bioconcentratable persistent organic pollutants (POPs) was shown to result in adverse ecological effects, industry developed a wide range of increasing water-soluble, polar hydrophilic organic compounds (HpOCs) to replace them. These compounds generally have lower bioconcentration factors. However, there is evidence that large fluxes of these HpOCs into aquatic environments may be responsible for a number of adverse effects to aquatic organisms, such as altered behavior, neurotoxicity, endocrine disruption, and impaired reproduction. In the late 1990s research was underway to develop a new passive sampler in order to monitor HpOCs with a log Kow value of less than 3. In 1999 the POCIS sampler was under development at the University of Missouri-Columbia. It gathered more support in the early 2000s as concern increased regarding the effects of pharmaceutical and personal care products in surface waters.

The United States Geological Survey (USGS) has been heavily involved in the development of passive samplers and has articles in their database regarding the development of POCIS as early as 2000. The USGS Columbia Environmental Research Center (CERC) is a self-proclaimed international leader in the field of passive sampling. There have been recent efforts by the USGS to connect people who have an interest in passive sampling. An international workshop and symposium on passive sampling was held by the USGS in 2013 to connect developers, policy makers and end users in order to discuss ways of monitoring environmental pollution.

== Fundamentals ==
The POCIS device was developed and patented by Jimmie D. Petty, James N. Huckins, and David A. Alvarez, of the Columbia Environmental Research Center. Integrative passive samplers are an effective way to monitor the concentration of organic contaminants in aquatic systems over time. Most aquatic monitoring programs rely on collecting individual samples, often called grab samples, at a specific time. The grab sampling method is associated with many disadvantages that can be resolved by passive sampling techniques. When contaminants are present in trace amounts, grab sampling may require the collection of large volumes of water. Also, lab analysis of the sample can only provide a snapshot of contaminant levels at the time of collection. This approach therefore has drawbacks when monitoring in environments where water contamination varies over time and episodic contamination events occur. Passive sampling techniques have been able to provide a time-integrated sample of water contamination with low detection limits and in situ extraction of analytes.

=== POCIS set-up ===
The POCIS sampler consists of an array of sampling disks mounted on a support rod. Each disk consists of a solid sorbent sandwiched between two polyethersulfone (PES) microporous membranes which are then compressed between two stainless steel rings which expose a sampling area. A standard POCIS disk consists of a sampling surface area to sorbent mass ratio of approximately 180 cm^{2}g. Because the amount of chemical sampled is directly related to the sample surface area, it is sometimes necessary to combine extracts from multiple POCIS disks into one sample. Stainless steel rings, or other rigid inert material, are essential to prevent sorbent loss as the PES membranes are not able to be heat sealed. The POCIS array is then inserted and deployed within a protective canister. This canister is usually made of stainless steel or PVC and works to deflect debris that may displace the POCIS array during its deployment.

The PES membrane acts as a semipermeable barrier between the sorbent and surrounding aquatic environment. It allows dissolved contaminants to pass through the sorbent while selectively excluding any particles larger than 100 nm. The membrane resists biofouling because the polyethersulfone used in the design is less prone than other materials. The POCIS is versatile in that the sorbents can be changed to target different classes of contaminants. However, only two sorbent classes are considered as standards of all POCIS deployments to date.

=== Theory and modeling ===
Each POCIS disk will sample a certain volume of water per day. The volume of water sampled varies from chemical to chemical and is dependent on the physical and chemical properties of the compound as well as the duration of sampling. The sampling rate of POCIS can vary with changes in the water flow, turbulence, temperature, and the buildup of solids on the sampler’s surface. The accumulation of contaminants into a POCIS device is the result of three successive process occurring at the same time. First, the contaminants have to diffuse across the water boundary layer. The thickness of this layer is dependent on water flow and turbulence around the sampler and can significantly alter sampling rates. Second, the contaminant must transport across the membrane either through the water-filled pores or through the membrane itself. Finally, contaminants transfer from the membrane into the sorbent material mainly through adsorption. These last two steps make the modeling, understanding, and prediction of accumulation by a POCIS device challenging. To date, a limited number of chemical sampling rates have been determined.

Accumulation of chemicals by a POCIS device generally follows first order kinetics. The kinetics are characterized by an initial integrative phase, followed by an equilibrium partitioning phase. During the integrative phase of uptake, a passive sampling device accumulates residues linearly relative to time, assuming constant exposure concentrations. Based on current results, the POCIS sampler remains in a linear phase for at least 30 days, and has been observed up to 56 days. Therefore, both laboratory and field data justify the use of a linear uptake model for the calculation of sample rates. In order to estimate the ambient water concentration of contaminants sampled by a POCIS device, there must be available calibration data applicable for in situ conditions regarding the target compound. Currently, this information is limited.

== Applicability ==
POCIS can be deployed in a wide range of aquatic environments including stagnant pools, rivers, springs, estuarine systems, and wastewater streams. However, there has been little research into the use of POCIS in strictly marine environments. Prior to deployment of a POCIS device, it is essential to select a study site that will maximize the effectiveness of the sampler. Selecting an area that is shaded will help prevent light sensitive chemicals from being degrading. The site should also allow the sampler to be submerged in the water without being buried in the sediment. It is ideal to place the sampler in moving water in order to increase sampling rates, however, areas with an extremely turbulent water flow should be avoided as to prevent damage to the POCIS device. Passive samplers are very vulnerable to vandalism and it is therefore important to secure the sampler in areas that are not easily visible and that are away from areas frequently used by people.

POCIS samplers can be deployed for a period of time ranging from weeks to months. The shortest deployment lengths are typically 7 days but average 2–3 months. It is important to have a long enough deployment period to allow for adequate detection of contaminants at ambient environmental concentrations. Often, the two different types of POCIS devices will be deployed together in order to provide the greatest understanding of contamination. It is also important to deploy enough POCIS devices to ensure a large enough sample of contaminant is recovered for chemical analysis. An estimate or the number of samplers needed at a given site can be determined by the following equation.

R_{s} x t x n x C_{c} x P_{r} x E_{t} > MQL x V_{i}

where
- C_{c} is the predicted environmental concentration of the contaminant
- t is the deployment time in days
- R_{s} is sampling rate in liters of water extracted by the passive sampler per day(L/day)
- P_{r} is the overall method recovery for the analyte (expressed as a factor of one; ::therefore 0.9 is used for 90 percent recovery),
- n is the number of passive samplers combined into a single sample,
- E_{t} is the fraction of the total sample extract which is injected into the ::instrument for quantification
- MQL is the method quantification limit
- V_{i} is the volume of standard injection (commonly 1 μL).

=== Relevant contaminants ===
Any compound with a log Kow of less than or equal to 3 can concentrate in a POCIS sampler. Applicable classes of contaminants measured by POCIS are pharmaceuticals, household and industrial products, hormones, herbicides, and polar pesticides (Table 1). Currently, there are two POCIS configurations that are targeted for different classes of contaminants. A general POCIS design contains a sorbent that is used to collect pesticides, natural as well as synthetic hormones, and wastewater related chemicals. The pharmaceutical POCIS configuration contains a sorbent that is designed to specifically target classes of pharmaceuticals.

Applicable contaminants that concentrate in a POCIS device. Not to be considered a complete list.

Chemical Class	Examples
Pharmaceuticals	acetaminophen, azithromycin, carbamazepine, ibuprofen, propranolol, sulfa drugs, tetracycline antibiotics
Household and industrial products	alkyl phenols, benzophenone, caffeine, DEET, fire retardants, indole, triclosan
Hormones	17β-estradiol, 17α-ethynlestradiol, estrone, estriol
Herbicides	atrazine, cyanazine, hydroxyatrazine, tertbutylazine
Polar pesticides	alachlor, chlorpyrifos, diainon, dichlorvos, diuron, isoproturon, metolachlor
Other	Urobilin

=== POCIS processing ===
Before the POCIS is constructed, all the hardware as well as the sorbents and membrane must be thoroughly cleaned so that any potential interference is removed. During and after sampling the only cleaning necessary is the removal of any sediment that has adhered to the surface of the sampler. After assembly, and prior to deployment, the samplers are stored in frozen airtight containers to avoid any contamination. The samplers should be kept in airtight containers during transportation both to and from the sampling site so that airborne contaminants do not contaminate the sampler. It is ideal to keep the samplers cold while transporting them in order to preserve the integrity of the samples.

After the POCIS is retrieved from the field, the membrane is gently cleaned to reduce the possibility of any contamination to the sorbent. The sorbent is placed into a chromatography column so that the chemicals that samples can be recovered using an organic solvent. The solvent used is specifically chosen based on the type of sorbent and chemicals sampled. The sample can go through further processing such as cleanup or fractionation depending on the desired use of the sample.

=== Data analysis ===
After the sample has been processed, the extract can be analysed using a variety of data analysis techniques. The chemical analysis and analytical instrumentation used depends on the goal of the study. Many analyses require multiple samples, although in some cases a single POCIS sample can be used for multiple analyses.

It is vital to use quality control (QC) procedures when using passive samplers. It is common practice for 10% to 50% of the total number of samples to be used for QC purposes. The number of QC samples depends on the study objectives. The QC samples are used to address issues such as sample contamination and analyte recovery. The types of QC samples commonly used include; reagent blanks, field blanks, matrix spikes, and procedural spikes.

A large number of studies have been performed in which POCIS data was combined with bioassays to measure biological endpoints. Testing POCIS extracts in biological assays is useful as a POCIS device samples over its entire deployment period, and biologically active compounds can be effectively monitored. It can also be argued that the use of POCIS is a more relevant from an ecotoxicological perspective as the use of a passive sampler mimics the uptake of compounds by organisms. Another strength in using bioassays to test environmental samples is that they can provide an integrative measure of the toxic potential of a group of chemical compounds, rather than a single contaminant.

== Other passive samplers ==
There are many types of passive samplers used that specialize in absorbing different classes of aquatic contaminants found in the environment. Chemcatcher and SMPD are two types of passive samplers that are also commonly used. Monitoring programs use SMPDs to measure to hydrophobic organic contaminants. SPMDs are designed to mimic the bioconcentration of contaminants in fatty tissues (ITRC, 2006). Contaminants applicable to the use of an SPMD include, but are not limited to, polychlorinated biphenyls (PCBs), polycyclic aromatic hydrocarbons (PAHs), organochlorine pesticides, dioxins, and furans.

The SPMD consist of a thin-walled, nonporous, polyethylene membrane tube that is filled with high molecular weight lipid. These tubes are approximately 90 cm long and wrap around the inside of a stainless steel deployment canister. SMPDs are efficient at absorbing pollutants with a log Kow of 4-8. This slightly overlaps with the range of contaminants absorbed by POCIS. Because of this, SMPDs and POCIS devices are often used together in monitoring studies to achieve a more representative understanding of contamination.

== Future development ==
The POCIS system is continually evaluated for the potential to sample a wide range of contaminants. Calibration data and analyte recovery methods are currently being generated by researchers around the world. Techniques to merge the POCIS device with bioassays are also under development. The POCIS sampler already serves as a versatile, economical, and robust tool for monitoring studies and observing trends in both space and time. However, sampling rates are not yet robust enough to supply reliable contaminant concentrations, particularly when regarding environmental quality standards. A limited number of sampling rates have been determined for chemicals and the determination of additional sampling rate data is necessary for the advancement of passive sampling technology.
