= Passive sampling =

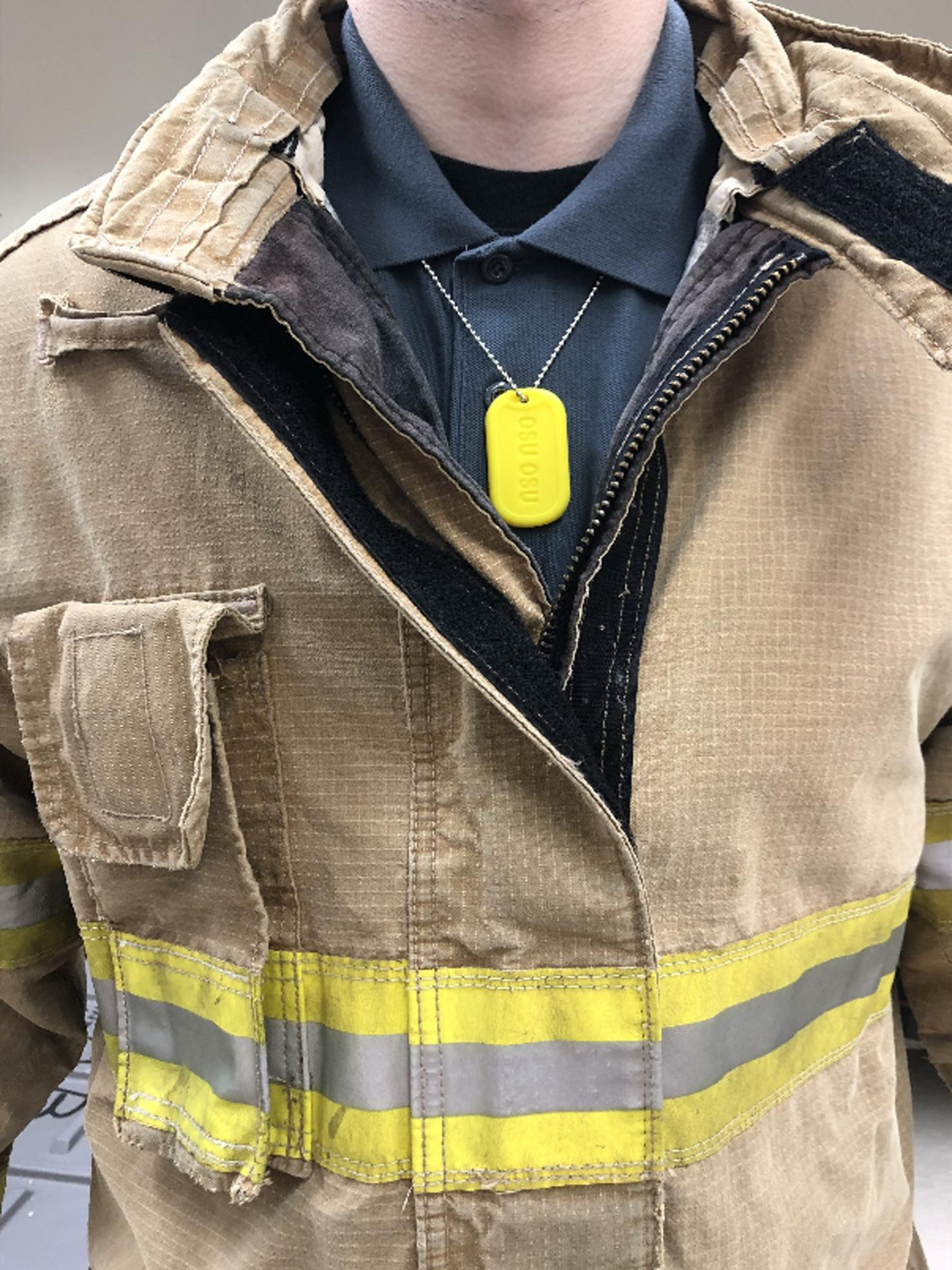
A firefighter wearing a silicone passive sampler on an elastic necklace, shaped like a dog tag

Passive sampling is an environmental monitoring technique involving the use of a collecting medium, such as a man-made device or biological organism, to accumulate chemical pollutants in the environment over time. This is in contrast to grab sampling, which involves taking a sample directly from the media of interest at one point in time. In passive sampling, average chemical concentrations are calculated over a device's deployment time, which avoids the need to visit a sampling site multiple times to collect multiple representative samples. Currently, passive samplers have been developed and deployed to detect toxic metals, pesticides, pharmaceuticals, radionuclides, polycyclic aromatic hydrocarbons (PAHs), polychlorinated biphenyls (PCBs), and other organic compounds in water, while some passive samplers can detect hazardous substances in the air.

== Theory and application ==
The underlying principle of passive sampling is the flow of contaminant molecules or ions from the sampling medium (air or water) onto a collecting medium (the passive sampler), due to Fick's first law of diffusion and, depending on the passive sampler, a greater binding affinity of contaminants with the collecting medium as compared to the sampling medium. As a result, contaminants concentrate on the collecting medium over time until they reach equilibrium with the surrounding medium. The use of passive sampling provides time-averaged concentrations of contaminants over the sampler's deployment period.

It is important to distinguish passive sampling from active sampling, which has the same underlying principle but employs moving parts, such as pumps, to force the sampling medium onto a collecting medium. Passive sampling solely relies on molecular diffusion and the sorbing or binding of contaminants to agents in the samplers, which is why passive sampling is also called diffusive sampling.

Passive sampling is also distinct from grab sampling, which is the collection of an air, water, or soil sample to analyze directly for contaminants. These samples represent a single point in time and provide information about contaminant concentration at one point in time, unlike passive sampling devices or organisms.

Many different kinds of passive samplers have been developed and have sampled many different contaminants, including:

- Antibiotics
- Bisphenols
- Dioxins
- Flame retardants
- Furans
- Nanoparticles
- Oxyanions such as phosphates
- Polybrominated diphenyl ethers (PBDEs)
- Polycyclic aromatic hydrocarbons (PAHs)
- Polychlorinated biphenyls (PCBs)
- Pesticides
- Pharmaceuticals
- Radionuclides
- Toxic metals (Such as copper, zinc, and lead)

== Passive sampling in water ==
Several kinds of passive sampling devices exist for monitoring pollutants present in water. In addition to these devices, organisms, such as mussels, living in the environment also "passively sample" contaminants (bioaccumulation) and can be used to monitor water pollution (biomonitoring).

=== Chemcatcher ===
Chemcatcher can passively sample inorganic pollutants (metals) and a wide range of organic pollutants. It is composed of a single-use disc, with or without a membrane, sealed into a plastic support. Types of receiving phases and membranes vary greatly, depending on the target chemicals to be sampled. Time-averaged water concentrations of many chemical pollutants can be determined as long as sampling rate and the water flow rate are known.

=== Diffusive gradients in thin films (DGT) ===
Diffusive gradients in thin films (DGT) samplers passively sample ionic trace metals, as well as antibiotics, oxyanions, bisphenols, and nanoparticles in different configurations. They are composed of plastic pistons and caps, with a window that exposes a binding gel, diffusive gel, and filter membrane to the sampling water. They can be used in both freshwater and marine environments, as well as in the water located between freshwater and marine sediment particles, called pore water or interstitial water. Once the mass of accumulated contaminants on the DGT sampler is known, the DGT equation (based on Fick's law) can be used to calculate the time averaged water concentration of contaminants.

=== Microporous polyethylene tubes (MPT) ===
Microporous polyethylene tubes (MPT) attempt to mitigate the flow-dependency of other kinetic passive samplers such as Chemcatcher and POCIS by introducing a thicker membrane. The diffusive polyethylene layer prevents the thickness of the water-boundary layer (which is affected by flow) from dominating diffusion. The tube is filled with sorbents depending on the chemicals or chemical groups being sampled and has been successfully used to sample glyphosate, AMPA, illicit drugs and pharmaceuticals and personal care products.

=== Peepers ===
Peepers are passive diffusion samplers used for metals in freshwater and marine sediment pore water, so they can be used to find areas that may have metal-contaminated sediments. Peepers are plastic vessels filled with clean water and covered in a dialysis membrane, which allows metals in sediment pore water to enter the water inside the peeper. They are usually placed deep enough into sediment to be in an anoxic environment, in which metals will be soluble enough to sample. If the peepers are deployed long enough so the sediment pore water and contained peeper water reach equilibrium, they can accurately provide metal concentrations in sampled sediment pore water.

=== Polar organic chemical integrative sampler (POCIS) ===
Polar organic chemical integrative samplers (POCIS) sample polar organic contaminants with a log octanol-water partition coefficient (K_{ow}) value that is less than 3. Examples of these types of chemicals include polar pesticides, pharmaceuticals, illicit drugs, flame retardants, and drug metabolites. The POCIS is composed of variable numbers of solid sorbent discs attached to a support rod and encased in a metal cage, and has two possible sorbent configurations, the pesticide-POCIS and pharmaceutical-POCIS. As long as the amount of water passing over the sampler is known, polar organic contaminant water concentrations can be calculated after extracting sorbed contaminants from a POCIS.

=== Semipermeable membrane devices (SPMDs) ===
Semipermeable membrane devices (SPMDs) passively sample nonpolar organic contaminants with a log octanol-water partition coefficient (K_{ow}) value greater than 3. Examples of these types of chemicals include polycyclic aromatic hydrocarbons (PAHs), polychlorinated biphenyls (PCBs), polybrominated diphenyl ethers (PBDEs), chlorinated pesticides, dioxins, and furans. SPMDs are composed of sealed plastic tubing filled with triolein, in which nonpolar organics are very soluble and which serves as a representation of the fatty tissues of aquatic organisms. The tubing is then weaved between metal rods and enclosed in a metal cage. The sampler can be made in varying lengths of tubing for different applications, since sampling rate depends on the surface area of tubing exposed to the water. As long as the amount of water passing over the sampler is known, nonpolar organic contaminant water concentrations can be calculated after extracting contaminants from a SPMD.

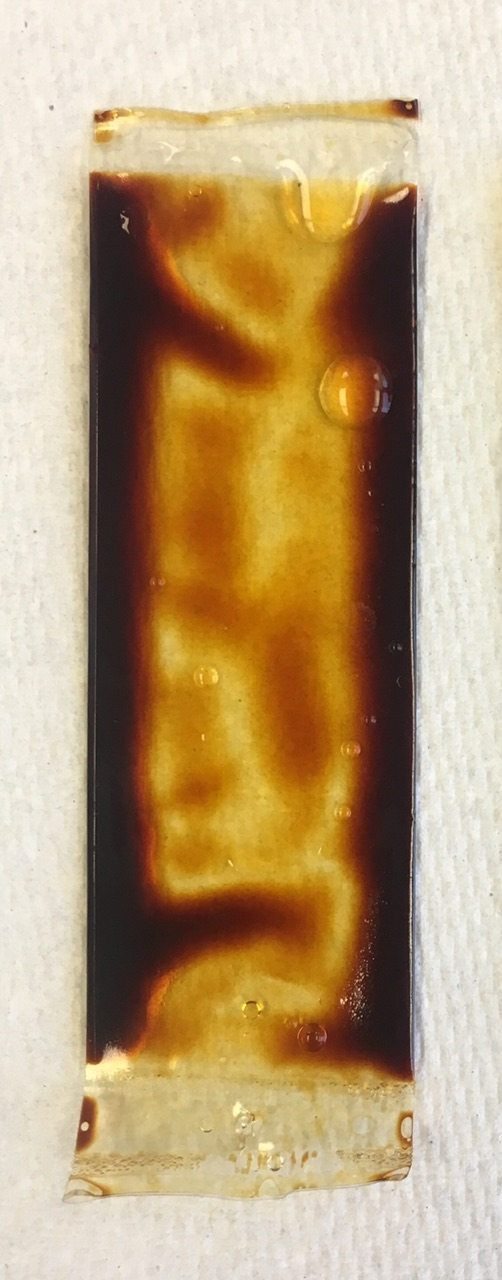
A 7.5 centimeter SLMD, filled with a 1:1 mixture of Kelex-100 and oleic acid.

=== Stabilized liquid membrane devices (SLMDs) ===
Stabilized liquid membrane devices (SLMDs) passively sample ionic metals in freshwater. They are made of low-density polyethylene plastic tubing sections that are sealed on both ends and filled with an equal mixture of oleic acid and metal chelating agent. They work by interacting with calcium and magnesium ions in freshwater, which forms a hydrophobic film on the outside the SLMD plastic membrane in which the chelating agent can bind to metals in the sampling water. They have been deployed for up to month-long periods in the field, alone or covered by a plastic tube housing to mediate water flow. Metal weight accumulated by a SLMD over its deployment period can be calculated and divided by the SLMD deployment time to get an average metal weight accumulated per time unit, but currently, no method has been developed to convert this to an average metal concentration. In addition, SLMD sampling rates greatly vary with water flow rate, which plastic housings can be used to control.

== Passive sampling in air ==
Passive sampling can also be accomplished for contaminants in the air, including airborne particles and hazardous vapors and gases. This can be done with man-made devices or with biomonitoring organisms, such as lichens.

=== Sorbent tubes ===
Sorbent tubes are passive samplers for volatile organic compounds (VOCs). They are glass tubes filled with adsorbing materials, such as charcoal or silica gel, which the air to be sampled passes through. The adsorbing materials remove VOCs from the air that passes through them, and the VOCs can be desorbed and analyzed. Air concentrations can be calculated using the amount of air that flowed through the sorbent tube and the amount of contaminants desorbed.

== Advantages ==
Contaminant concentrations from passive sampling reflect average contamination throughout the sampler deployment time, meaning the sample will capture contaminant concentration fluctuations over the whole deployment period. Traditional grab sampling does not do this, since collected samples only represent a single moment in time and multiple grab samples must be taken to observe variation in contaminant concentrations over time. This integrative sampling method can also result in the detection of chemicals present at such low concentrations that they would be undetected in a grab sample, due to concentration of the chemicals on the sampler over time. As a result, passive sampling has the potential to be a less time-intensive, less expensive and more accurate sampling method than grab sampling.

In addition, passive samplers are often easy to use and deploy, have no pumps or moving parts, and do not require electricity, since they rely on the molecular diffusion of contaminants or binding of contaminants to agents within the samplers, unlike active sampling. They may also be inexpensive and simple to construct, such as SLMDs, which only require sealed plastic tubing and two chemical components.

Passive sampling may also more accurately reflect metal concentrations that are bioavailable to organisms than other sampling methods. For example, the SPMD sampler uses a semipermeable membrane and triolein (a triglyceride), both of which mimic toxicant uptake by organism fatty tissue. However, this depends on the type of passive sampler used, since some samplers, such as peepers, rely solely on molecular diffusion, which may be too simple to be reflective of the complex processes of contaminant uptake in an organism.

== Disadvantages ==
Since passive sampling provides information about average contaminant concentrations, all possible concentrations over the sampler deployment time are included in this average value. However, there is no way of finding out the complete range of contaminant concentrations over the deployment time at a single site with only passive sampling. If high and low concentrations of contaminants throughout the sampling period are needed, other sampling methods should be used in conjunction with passive sampling.

Not all passive samplers have universally accurate ways to convert contaminant masses accumulated into water concentrations, which are used in government regulation, such as the United States Environmental Protection Agency Clean Water Act. With some samplers, as with the DGT, this can be done using equations developed for the samplers, but not all samplers have these. Passive sampler deployment time is also limited depending on the sampler's capacity; for example, SLMDs have been deployed for month-long periods, but may reach saturation and stop sampling much sooner if metal concentrations and water flow rates are high enough. However, this issue is avoidable if literature on the relevant passive sampler is examined for background information about sampler capacity and ideal deployment times prior to deployment.
