= DGTPase =

Class of enzymes

dGTPase

Identifiers
- EC no.: 3.1.5.1
- CAS no.: 9025-63-2

Databases
- BRENDA: enzyme data
- ExPASy: NiceZyme view
- KEGG: enzyme entry
- MetaCyc: metabolic pathway
- Rhea: reactions
- PDB structures: RCSB PDB PDBe PDBsum
- Gene Ontology: AmiGO / QuickGO
Search
- PMC: articles
- PubMed: articles
- NCBI: proteins

The enzyme dGTPase (EC 3.1.5.1) catalyzes the reaction

deoxyguanosine triphosphate
H_{2}O
PPP_{i}
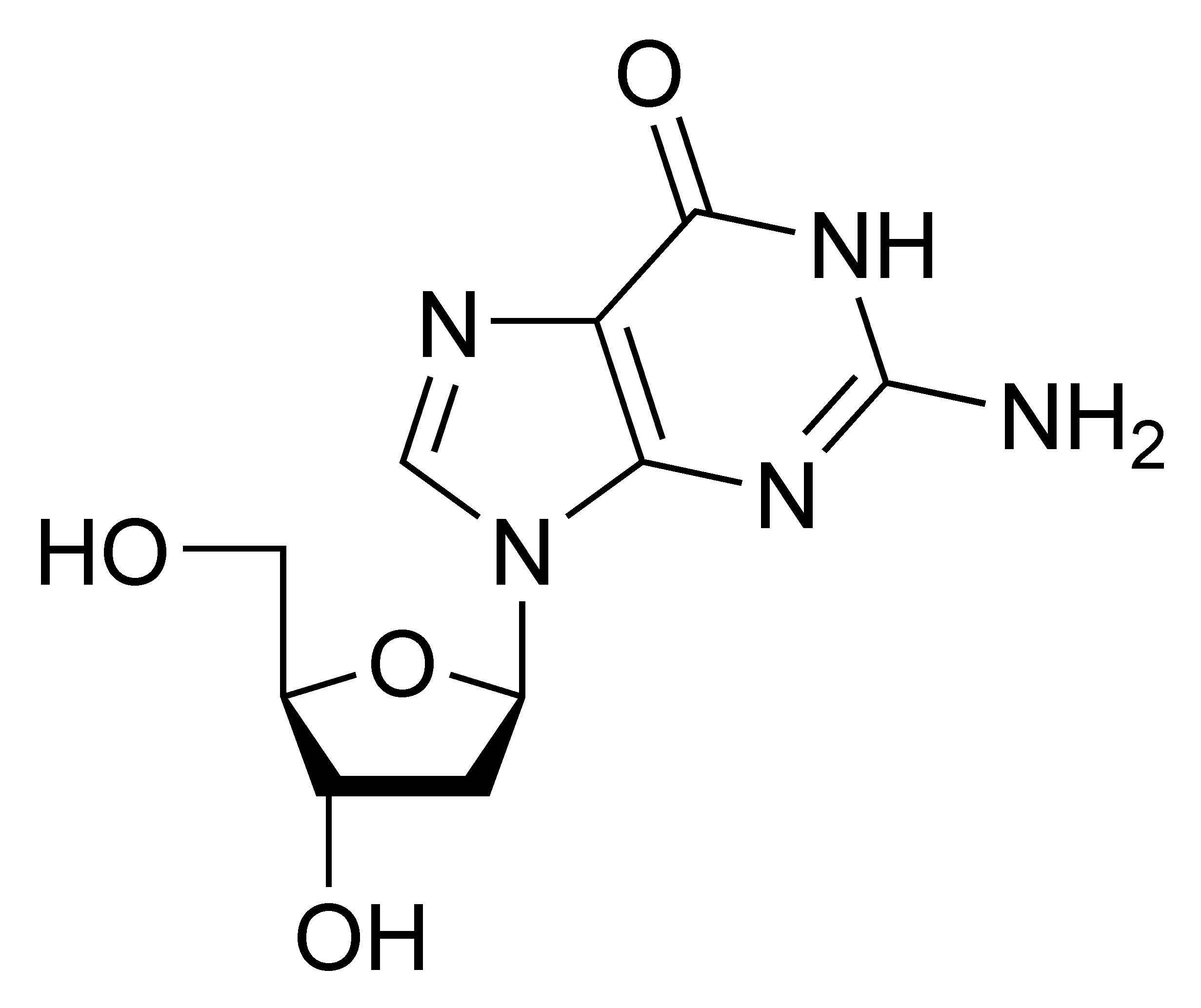
deoxyguanosine

The enzyme characterised from Escherichia coli hydrolyses deoxyguanosine triphosphate (dGTP) to deoxyguanosine by removal of a triphosphate group. As of 2019 it was the only known enzyme that specifically hydrolyzes dGTP. It sets the level of dGTP in the bacterium and helps protect it against bacteriophage T7 infection.

This enzyme is a hydrolase, specifically one acting on triphosphoric monoester bonds. The systematic name is dGTP triphosphohydrolase. Other names in use include deoxy-GTPase, deoxyguanosine 5-triphosphate triphosphohydrolase, deoxyguanosine triphosphatase, and deoxyguanosine triphosphate triphosphohydrolase.

== Structural studies ==
As of late 2007, 4 structures have been solved for this class of enzymes, with PDB accession codes PDB: 1HA3, PDB: 2C77, PDB: 2C78, and PDB: 2DQB.
