= Marc's Grab Bag =

- Genre: Talk show
- Presented by: Marc Stone
- Country of origin: Canada
- Original language: English
- No. of seasons: 1

Production
- Producer: Hedley Read
- Production location: Toronto

Original release
- Network: CBC Television
- Release: 11 September 1973 – 3 September 1974

Marc's Grab Bag is a Canadian arts talk show that aired on CBC Television from 1973 to 1974.

== Premise ==
Marc Stone hosted this youth-oriented talk show which was set in a coffee house. Topics were within the realm of arts with guests such as Karen Booth (animator), Monica Gaylord (pianist), Doug Hemmy (animator), Harris Kirschenbaum (film producer), Jack Schectman (singer-songwriter) and Naomi Tyrell (mime).

== Scheduling ==
This half-hour series aired Tuesdays at 5:00 p.m. (Eastern) from 11 September to 16 October 1973. Broadcasts resumed in the same time slot on 8 January until the final original episode on 26 March 1974. Episodes were repeated from June to September 1974.
