= Chemcatcher =

Passive sampling device for monitoring water pollutants

Chemcatcher is a passive sampling device for monitoring a variety of pollutants (including trace metals, polycyclic aromatic hydrocarbons, pesticides and pharmaceutical residues) in water. It is a reusable three component, water-tight PTFE body. Two different designs are available to accommodate different types of commercially available 47 mm diameter receiving phase disks.

== Background ==
Most monitoring programmes involve the periodic collection of low volume spot samples (bottle or grab) of water, which is challenging, particularly where levels fluctuate over time and when chemicals are only present at trace, yet toxicologically relevant concentrations. Chemcatcher is used to measure time-weighted average (TWA) or equilibrium concentrations of a wide range of pollutants in water. This allows the end user to obtain a more representative picture of the chemicals that may be present in the aquatic environment.

== Development ==
The Chemcatcher concept was developed by Professors Richard Greenwood and Graham Mills at the University of Portsmouth, together with colleagues from Chalmers University of Technology, Sweden. The device is patented in a number of countries and the name is a registered trademark in Ireland and the United Kingdom.

T.E. Laboratories (TelLab), based in Tullow, Ireland, holds the global licence to manufacture and sell Chemcatcher.

== Use ==
The sampler can be deployed in the field for extended periods of time ranging from days to weeks. The specific pollutants of interest are sequestered by the samplers and these are retained on the receiving phase disk. After retrieval from the environment the pollutants are eluted from the disk and analysed in the laboratory using conventional instrumental methods. In order to obtain TWA concentrations the sampler must first be calibrated in the laboratory so as to ascertain the uptake rate (usually measured as the volume of water cleared per unit time i.e. L/h for the analyte) of the pollutant of interest. Chemcatcher has been used in a range of aquatic environments; however, most work to date has been in monitoring the TWA concentrations of priority and emerging pollutants in surface waters.

The use of passive sampling devices, such as Chemcatcher or polar organic chemical integrative sampler (POCIS), has a number of advantages over the use of spot or bottle sampling for monitoring pollutants in the aquatic environment. The latter technique gives only an instantaneous concentration of the pollutant as the specific time of sampling. Passive samplers, depending on their mode of use, can give either the TWA or equilibrium concentration of the pollutant over the deployment period. The measurement of TWA concentrations can give a better indication of the long-term environmental conditions and enables improved risk assessment. Chemcatcher can be used to monitor both polar and non-polar compounds.
