= Triolein =

Names
- Systematic IUPAC name Propane-1,2,3-triyl tri[(9Z)-octadec-9-enoate]
- Other names Glyceryl trioleate

Identifiers
CAS Number	122-32-7
3D model (JSmol)	Interactive image
ChEBI	CHEBI:53753
ChemSpider	4593733
ECHA InfoCard	100.004.123
MeSH	Triolein
PubChem CID	5497163
UNII	O05EC62663
CompTox Dashboard (EPA)	DTXSID3026988
- InChI: InChI=1S/C57H104O6/c1-4-7-10-13-16-19-22-25-28-31-34-37-40-43-46-49-55(58)61-52-54(63-57(60)51-48-45-42-39-36-33-30-27-24-21-18-15-12-9-6-3)53-62-56(59)50-47-44-41-38-35-32-29-26-23-20-17-14-11-8-5-2/h25-30,54H,4-24,31-53H2,1-3H3/b28-25-,29-26-,30-27- Key: PHYFQTYBJUILEZ-IUPFWZBJSA-N; InChI=1/C57H104O6/c1-4-7-10-13-16-19-22-25-28-31-34-37-40-43-46-49-55(58)61-52-54(63-57(60)51-48-45-42-39-36-33-30-27-24-21-18-15-12-9-6-3)53-62-56(59)50-47-44-41-38-35-32-29-26-23-20-17-14-11-8-5-2/h25-30,54H,4-24,31-53H2,1-3H3/b28-25-,29-26-,30-27- Key: PHYFQTYBJUILEZ-IUPFWZBJBN
- SMILES: O=C(OCC(OC(=O)CCCCCCC\C=C/CCCCCCCC)COC(=O)CCCCCCC\C=C/CCCCCCCC)CCCCCCC\C=C/CCCCCCCC

Properties
Chemical formula	C_{57}H_{104}O_{6}
Molar mass	885.432 g/mol
Appearance	Colourless viscous liquid
Density	0.9078 g/cm^{3} at 25 °C
Melting point	5 °C; 41 °F; 278 K
Boiling point	554.2 °C; 1,029.6 °F; 827.4 K
Solubility	Chloroform 0.1g/mL

Hazards
Flash point	302.6 °C (576.7 °F; 575.8 K)

Thermochemistry
Std enthalpy of formation (Δ_{f}H^{⦵}_{298})	1.97·10^{5} kJ/kmol
Gibbs free energy (Δ_{f}G^{⦵})	−1.8·10^{5} kJ/kmol
Std enthalpy of combustion (Δ_{c}H^{⦵}_{298})	8,389 kcal (35,100 kJ) /mole
- Except where otherwise noted, data are given for materials in their standard state (at 25 °C [77 °F], 100 kPa). verify (what is ?) Infobox references

Triolein (glyceryl trioleate) is a symmetrical triglyceride derived from glycerol and three units of the unsaturated fatty acid oleic acid. Most triglycerides are unsymmetrical, being derived from mixtures of fatty acids. Triolein represents 4–30% of olive oil.

Triolein is also known as glyceryl trioleate and is one of the two components of Lorenzo's oil.

The oxidation of triolein is according to the formula:

C_{57}H_{104}O_{6} + 80 O_{2} → 57 CO_{2} + 52 H_{2}O

This gives a respiratory quotient of 57/80 or 0.7125. The heat of combustion is 8,389 kcal (35,100 kJ) per mole or 9.474 kcal (39.64 kJ) per gram. Per mole of oxygen it is 104.9 kcal (439 kJ).
