= Lovibond =

Lovibond may refer to:

- Joseph Williams Lovibond (1833–1918), British brewer
  - Degrees Lovibond, a colour scale, named after him
  - Lovibond comparator, a type of colorimeter
  - Tintometer, a UK company
- Lady Lovibond, a ship
- Ophelia Lovibond (born 1986), English actress
- Lovibond angle
- Daihatsu Rocky, known as Lovibond Rocky, an off-road vehicle produced by Daihatsu
