= Analysis of water chemistry =

Water chemistry analyses are carried out to identify and quantify the chemical components and properties of water samples. The type and sensitivity of the analysis depends on the purpose of the analysis and the anticipated use of the water. Chemical water analysis is carried out on water used in industrial processes, on waste-water stream, on rivers and stream, on rainfall and on the sea. In all cases the results of the analysis provides information that can be used to make decisions or to provide re-assurance that conditions are as expected. The analytical parameters selected are chosen to be appropriate for the decision-making process or to establish acceptable normality. Water chemistry analysis is often the groundwork of studies of water quality, pollution, hydrology and geothermal waters. Analytical methods routinely used can detect and measure all the natural elements and their inorganic compounds and a very wide range of organic chemical species using methods such as gas chromatography and mass spectrometry. In water treatment plants producing drinking water and in some industrial processes using products with distinctive taste and odors, specialized organoleptic methods may be used to detect smells at very low concentrations.

== Types of water ==
=== Environmental water ===
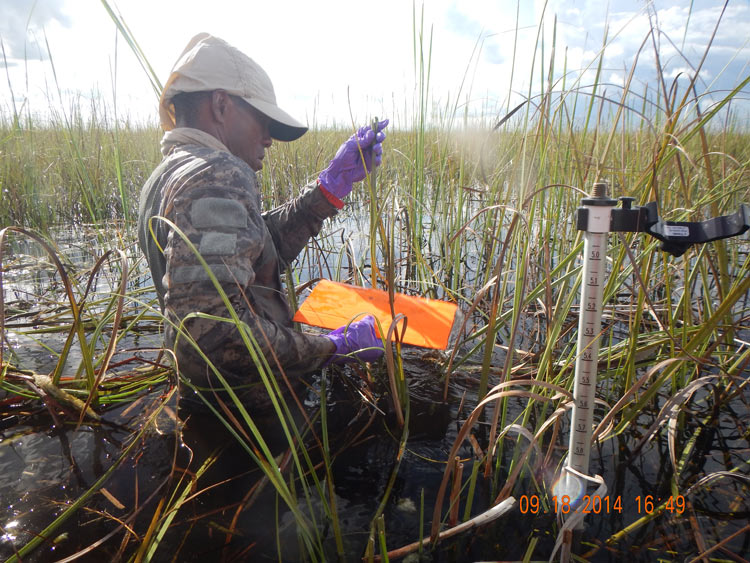
An EPA scientist samples water in Florida Everglades

Samples of water from the natural environment are routinely taken and analyzed as part of a pre-determined monitoring program by regulatory authorities to ensure that waters remain unpolluted, or if polluted, that the levels of pollution are not increasing or are falling in line with an agreed remediation plan. An example of such a scheme is the harmonized monitoring scheme operated on all the major river systems in the UK. The parameters analyzed will be highly dependent on nature of the local environment and/or the polluting sources in the area. In many cases the parameters will reflect the national and local water quality standards determined by law or other regulations. Typical parameters for ensuring that unpolluted surface waters remain within acceptable chemical standards include pH, major cations and anions including ammonia, nitrate, nitrite, phosphate, conductivity, phenol, chemical oxygen demand (COD) and biochemical oxygen demand (BOD).

=== Drinking water supplies ===
Surface or ground water abstracted for the supply of drinking water must be capable of meeting rigorous chemical standards following treatment. This requires a detailed knowledge of the water entering the treatment plant. In addition to the normal suite of environmental chemical parameters, other parameters such as hardness, phenol, oil and in some cases a real-time organic profile of the incoming water as in the River Dee regulation scheme.

=== Industrial process water ===
In industrial process, the control of the quality of process water can be critical to the quality of the end product. Water is often used as a carrier of reagents and the loss of reagent to product must be continuously monitored to ensure that correct replacement rate. Parameters measured relate specifically to the process in use and to any of the expected contaminants that may arise as by-products. This may include unwanted organic chemicals appearing in an inorganic chemical process through contamination with oils and greases from machinery. Monitoring the quality of the wastewater discharged from industrial premises is a key factor in controlling and minimizing pollution of the environment. In this application monitoring schemes Analyse for all possible contaminants arising within the process and in addition contaminants that may have particularly adverse impacts on the environment such as cyanide and many organic species such as pesticides. In the nuclear industry analysis focuses on specific isotopes or elements of interest. Where the nuclear industry makes wastewater discharges to rivers which have drinking water abstraction on them, radioisotopes which could potentially be harmful or those with long half-lives such as tritium will form part of the routine monitoring suite.

== Methodology ==
To ensure consistency and repeatability, the methods use in the chemical analysis of water samples are often agreed and published at a national or state level. By convention these are often referred to as "Blue book".

Certain analyses are performed in-field (e.g. pH, specific conductance) while others involve sampling and laboratory testing.

The methods defined in the relevant standards can be broadly classified as:

- Conventional wet chemistry including the Winkler method for dissolved oxygen, precipitation, filtration for solids, acidification, neutralization, titration etc. Colorimetric methods such as MBAS assay which indicates anionic surfactants in water and on site comparator methods to determine chlorine and chloramines. Nephelometers are used to measure solids concentrations as turbidity. These methods are generally robust and well tried and inexpensive, giving a reasonable degree of accuracy at modest sensitivity.
- Electro chemistry including pH, conductivity and dissolved oxygen using oxygen electrode. These methods yield accurate and precise results using electronic equipment capable of feeding results directly into a laboratory data management system
- Spectrophotometry is used particularly for metallic elements in solution producing results with very high sensitivity, but which may require some sample preparation prior to analysis and may also need specialized sampling methods to avoid sample deterioration in transit.
- Chromatography is used for many organic species which are volatile, or which can yield a characteristic volatile component of after initial chemical processing.
- Ion chromatography is a sensitive and stable technique that can measure lithium, ammonium NH_{4} and many other low molecular weight ions using ion exchange technology.
- Gas chromatography can be used to determine methane, carbon dioxide, cyanide, oxygen, nitrogen and many other volatile components at reasonable sensitivities.
- Mass spectrometry is used where very high sensitivity is required and is sometimes used as a back-end process after gas liquid chromatography for detecting trace organic chemicals.

Depending on the components, different methods are applied to determine the quantities or ratios of the components. While some methods can be performed with standard laboratory equipment, others require advanced devices, such as inductively coupled plasma mass spectrometry (ICP-MS).

=== Research ===
Many aspects of academic research and industrial research such as in pharmaceuticals, health products, and many others relies on accurate water analysis to identify substances of potential use, to refine those substances and to ensure that when they are manufactured for sale that the chemical composition remains consistent. The analytical methods used in this area can be very complex and may be specific to the process or area of research being conducted and may involve the use of bespoke analytical equipment.

== Forensic analysis ==
In environmental management, water analysis is frequently deployed when pollution is suspected to identify the pollutant in order to take remedial action. The analysis can often enable the polluter to be identified. Such forensic work can examine the ratios of various components and can "type" samples of oils or other mixed organic contaminants to directly link the pollutant with the source. In drinking water supplies the cause of unacceptable quality can similarly be determined by carefully targeted chemical analysis of samples taken throughout the distribution system. In manufacturing, off-spec products may be directly tied back to unexpected changes in wet processing stages and analytical chemistry can identify which stages may be at fault and for what reason.

== See also ==
- Analytical chemistry
- Drinking water quality standards
- Analytical quality control
