= NADH peroxidase =

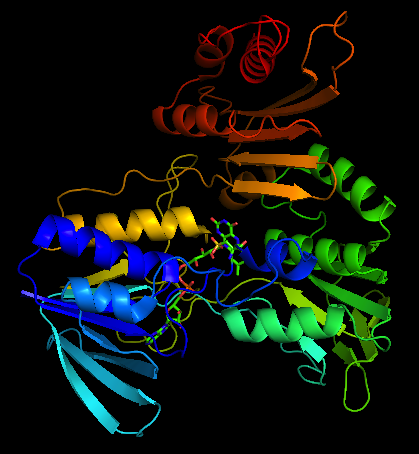
- The structure of NADH peroxidase from Enterococcus faecalis. Adapted from PDB: 2NPX.

Identifiers
- EC no.: 1.11.1.1
- CAS no.: 9032-24-0

Databases
- BRENDA: enzyme data
- ExPASy: NiceZyme view
- KEGG: enzyme entry
- MetaCyc: metabolic pathway
- Rhea: reactions
- PDB structures: RCSB PDB PDBe PDBsum
- Gene Ontology: AmiGO / QuickGO
Search
- PMC: articles
- PubMed: articles
- NCBI: proteins

In enzymology, a NADH peroxidase (EC 1.11.1.1) is an enzyme that catalyzes the chemical reaction

NADH + H^{+} + H_{2}O_{2} $\rightleftharpoons$ NAD^{+} + 2 H_{2}O

The presumed function of NADH peroxidase is to inactivate H_{2}O_{2} generated within the cell, for example by glycerol-3-phosphate oxidase during glycerol metabolism or dismutation of superoxide, before the H_{2}O_{2} causes damage to essential cellular components.

The 3 substrates of this enzyme are NADH, H^{+}, and H_{2}O_{2}, whereas its two products are NAD^{+} and H_{2}O. It employs one cofactor, FAD, however no discrete FADH_{2} intermediate has been observed.

This enzyme belongs to the family of oxidoreductases, specifically those acting on a peroxide as acceptor (peroxidases). The systematic name of this enzyme class is NADH:hydrogen-peroxide oxidoreductase. Other names in common use include DPNH peroxidase, NAD peroxidase, diphosphopyridine nucleotide peroxidase, NADH-peroxidase, nicotinamide adenine dinucleotide peroxidase, and NADH2 peroxidase.

== Structure ==
The crystal structure of NADH peroxidase resembles glutathione reductase with respect to chain fold and location as well as conformation of the prosthetic group FAD

His10 of the NADH peroxidase is located near the N-terminus of the R1 helix within the FAD-binding site. One of the oxygen atoms of Cys42-SO_{3}H is hydrogen-bonded both to the His10 imidazole and to Cys42 N terminus. The His10 functions in part to stabilize the unusual Cys42-SOH redox center. Arg303 also stabilizes the Cys42-SO_{3}H. Glu-14 participates in forming the tight dimer interface that limits solvent accessibility, important for maintaining the oxidation state of the sulfenic acid.

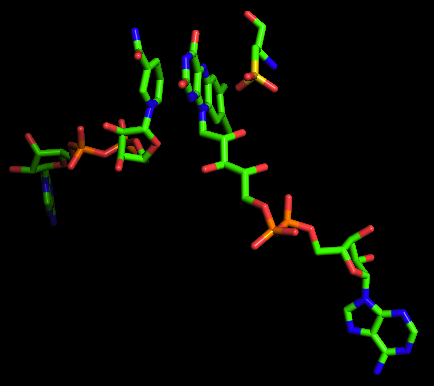
Alignment of NADH, FAD and Cysteine 42 in NADH Peroxidase, Adapted from PDB 2NPX

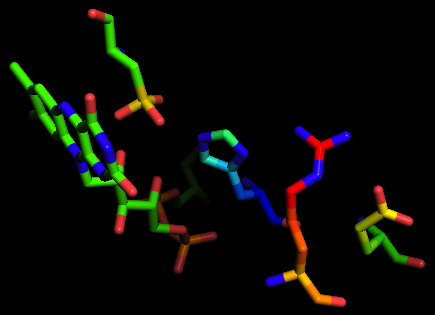
Four residues essential for active site functionality in NADH Peroxidase, Adapted from PDB 2NPX

== Reaction mechanism ==
The NADH peroxidase from Enterococcus faecalis is unique in that it utilizes the Cys42 thiol/sulfenic acid (-SH/-SOH) redox couple in the heterolytic cleavage of the peroxide bond to catalyze the two-electron reduction of hydrogen peroxide to water.

The kinetic mechanism of the wild-type peroxidase involves (1) NADH reduction of E(FAD, Cys42-SOH) to EH_{2}(FAD, Cys42-SH) in an initial priming step; (2) rapid binding of NADH to EH_{2}; (3) reduction of H_{2}O_{2} by the Cys42-thiolate, yielding E•NADH; and (4) rate-limiting hydride transfer from bound NADH, regenerating EH_{2}. No discrete FADH_{2} intermediate has been observed, however, and the precise details of Cys42-SOH reduction have not been elucidated.

1. E + NADH → (EH_{2}'•NAD^{+})* → EH_{2}'•NAD^{+} → EH_{2} + NAD^{+} + H_{2}O
2. EH_{2} + NADH → EH_{2}•NADH*
3. EH_{2}•NADH* + H_{2}O_{2} → E•NADH + H_{2}O
4. E•NADH + H^{+} → EH_{2}•NAD^{+} + H_{2}O
5. EH_{2}•NAD^{+} → EH_{2} + NAD^{+}

Inhibitors include Ag^{+}, Cl^{−}, Co^{2+}, Cu^{2+}, Hg^{2+}, NaN_{3}, Pb^{2+}, and SO_{4}^{2−}. At suboptimal H_{2}O_{2} concentrations and concentrations of NADH that are saturating, NADH inhibits the peroxidase activity of the NADH peroxidase by converting the enzyme to an unstable intermediate. NAD^{+} behaves as an activator by reversing the equilibria that lead to the unstable intermediate, thus converting the enzyme to the kinetically active complex that reduces H_{2}O_{2}.

== Biological Function ==
NADH eliminates potentially toxic hydrogen peroxide under aerobic growth conditions and represents an enzymatic defense available against H_{2}O_{2}-mediated oxidative stress. Second, the enzyme presents an additional mechanism for regeneration of the NAD^{+} essential to the strictly fermentative metabolism of this organism. The enzyme may also protect against exogenous H_{2}O_{2} and contribute to bacterial virulence.

The actual function of NADH peroxidases and oxidases in plants is still unclear, but they could act in early signaling of oxidative stress through producing H_{2}O_{2}.

An alternative role may include regulation of H_{2}O_{2} formation by NADH peroxidase and oxidase in cell wall loosening and reconstruction.
