= Colorimetric analysis =

Method of determining chemical concentration

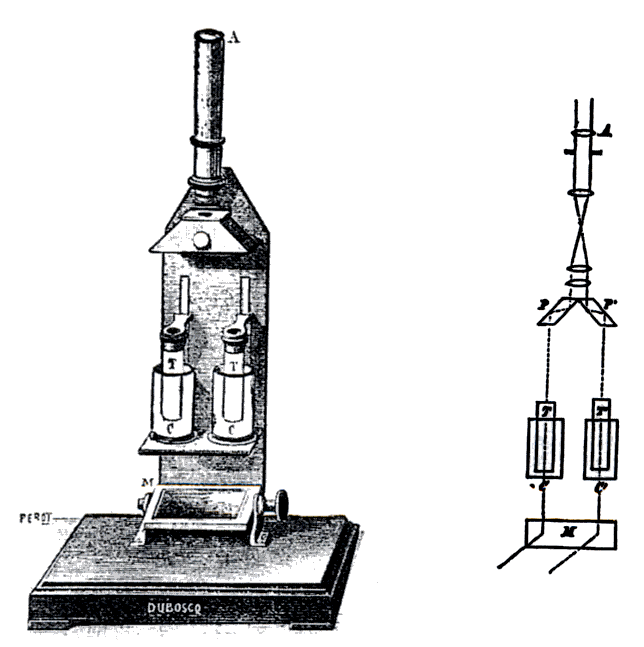
A Duboscq colorimeter, 1870, which allowed visual comparison of the absorptions in two columns of fluids while adjusting their depths

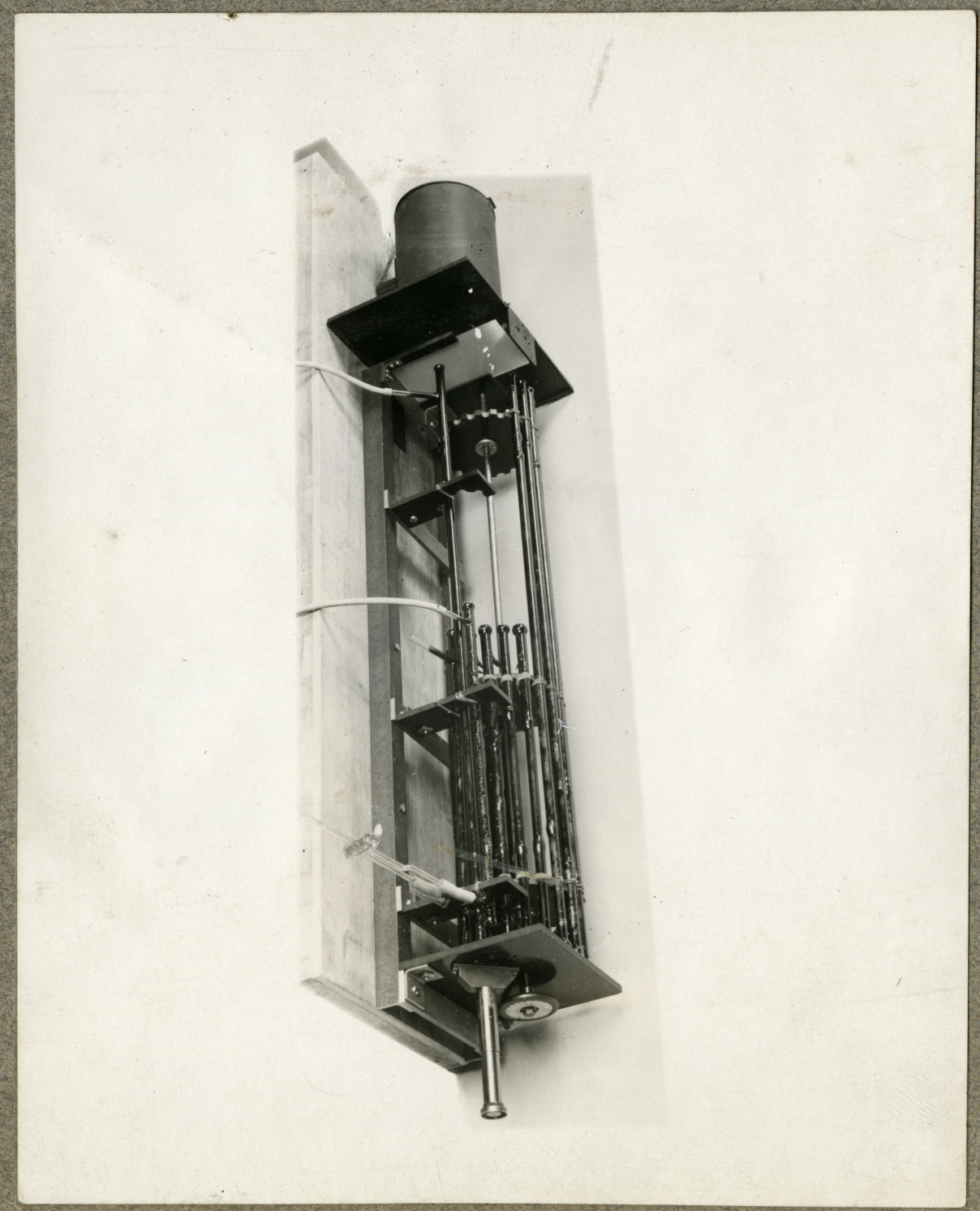
Colorimeter for NO_{2} analysis, Fixed Nitrogen Research Laboratory, ca.1930

In physical and analytical chemistry, colorimetric analysis is a method of determining the concentration of colored compounds or ions in solution. It is applicable to organic compounds, inorganic compounds, and ions. Often, analysis is completed with the aid of a reagent that reacts with the analyte to produce a colored product. Sometimes an enzymatic stage is required. The method is widely used in medical laboratories and for industrial purposes, e.g. the analysis of water samples in connection with industrial water treatment.

A colorimeter is a device used to measure absorbance of the solution at a specific wavelength of light (not to be confused with the tristimulus colorimeter used to measure colors in general). To use the colorimeter, different solutions must be made, including a control or reference of known concentration. With a visual colorimeter, for example the Duboscq colorimeter illustrated, the length of the light path through the solutions can be varied while filtered light transmitted through them is compared for a visual match. The concentration times path length is taken to be equal when the colors match, so the concentration of the unknown can be determined by simple proportions. Nessler tubes work on the same principle.

There are also electronic automated colorimeters; before these machines are used, they must be calibrated with a cuvette containing the control solution. The concentration of a sample can be calculated from the intensity of light before and after it passes through the sample by using the Beer–Lambert law. Photoelectric analyzers came to dominate in the 1960s. The color or wavelength of the filter chosen for the colorimeter is extremely important, as the wavelength of light that is transmitted by the colorimeter has to be the same as that absorbed by the substance being measured. For example, the filter on a colorimeter might be set to red if the liquid is blue.

== Equipment ==
The equipment required is a colorimeter, some cuvettes, and a suitable color reagent. The process may be automated, e.g. by the use of an AutoAnalyzer or by flow injection analysis. Recently, colorimetric analyses developed for colorimeters have been adapted for use with plate readers to speed up analysis and reduce the waste stream.

== Colorimetric assays ==
Colorimetric assays use reagents that undergo a measurable color change in the presence of the analyte. They are widely used in biochemistry to test for the presence of enzymes, specific compounds, antibodies, hormones, and many more analytes. For example,

- para-Nitrophenylphosphate is converted into a yellow product by alkaline phosphatase enzyme.
- Coomassie Blue is an aromatic dye that binds to aromatic proteins and positively charged amino acid residues within the protein structure. The binding interaction results in a spectrum shift, enabling quantitative measurement of the protein concentration. A similar colorimetric assay, the Bicinchoninic acid assay, uses a chemical reaction to determine protein concentration.
- The Biuret assay utilizes a biuret reagent which turns purple in the presence of proteins due to the chelation of copper salts in an alkaline solution.
- Enzyme linked immunoassays use enzyme-complexed-antibodies to detect antigens. Binding of the antibody is often inferred from the color change of reagents such as TMB.

== Non-enzymatic methods ==
=== Examples ===
==== Calcium ====
Calcium + o-cresolphthalein complexone → colored complex

==== Copper ====
Copper + bathocuproin disulfonate → colored complex

==== Creatinine ====
Creatinine + picrate → colored complex

==== Iron ====
Iron + bathophenanthroline disulfonate → colored complex

==== Phosphate (inorganic) ====
Phosphate + ammonium molybdate + ascorbic acid → blue colored complex

== Enzymatic methods ==
In enzymatic analysis (which is widely used in medical laboratories) the color reaction is preceded by a reaction catalyzed by an enzyme. As the enzyme is specific to a particular substrate, more accurate results can be obtained. Enzymatic analysis is always carried out in a buffer solution at a specified temperature (usually 37°C) to provide the optimum conditions for the enzymes to act. Examples follow.

=== Examples ===
==== Cholesterol (CHOD-PAP method) ====
1. Cholesterol + oxygen --(enzyme cholesterol oxidase)--> cholestenone + hydrogen peroxide
2. Hydrogen peroxide + 4-aminophenazone + phenol --(enzyme peroxidase)--> colored complex + water

==== Glucose (GOD-Perid method) ====
1. Glucose + oxygen + water --(enzyme glucose oxidase)--> gluconate + hydrogen peroxide
2. Hydrogen peroxide + ABTS --(enzyme peroxidase)--> colored complex

In this case, both stages of the reaction are catalyzed by enzymes.

==== Triglycerides (GPO-PAP method) ====
1. Triglycerides + water --(enzyme esterase)--> glycerol + carboxylic acid
2. Glycerol + ATP --(enzyme glycerol kinase)--> glycerol-3-phosphate + ADP
3. Glycerol-3-phosphate + oxygen --(enzyme glycerol-3-phosphate oxidase) --> dihydroxyacetone phosphate + hydrogen peroxide
4. Hydrogen peroxide + 4-aminophenazone + 4-chlorophenol --(enzyme peroxidase)--> colored complex

==== Urea ====
1. Urea + water --(enzyme urease)--> ammonium carbonate
2. Ammonium carbonate + phenol + hypochlorite ----> colored complex

In this case, only the first stage of the reaction is catalyzed by an enzyme. The second stage is non-enzymatic.

==== Abbreviations ====
- CHOD = cholesterol oxidase
- GOD = glucose oxidase
- GPO = glycerol-3-phosphate oxidase
- PAP = phenol + aminophenazone (in some methods the phenol is replaced by 4-chlorophenol, which is less toxic)
- POD = peroxidase

== Ultraviolet methods ==
In ultraviolet (UV) methods there is no visible color change but the principle is exactly the same, i.e. the measurement of a change in the absorbance of the solution. UV methods usually measure the difference in absorbance at 340 nm wavelength between nicotinamide adenine dinucleotide (NAD) and its reduced form (NADH).

=== Examples ===
==== Pyruvate ====
Pyruvate + NADH --(enzyme lactate dehydrogenase)--> L-lactate + NAD

== See also ==
- Blood sugar
- MBAS assay, an assay that indicates anionic surfactants in water with a bluing reaction.
- Nessler cylinder
- Jules Duboscq
- Permanganometry
- Lovibond colorimeter
- Turbidimetry
