= Quality control (disambiguation) =

Quality control is a process for maintaining proper standards in manufacturing.

Quality control may also refer to:

- Analytical quality control
- Quality Control (album), a 2000 album by Jurassic 5
  - "Quality Control", title track from the above
- Quality Control Music, an American record label
  - Quality Control: Control the Streets Volume 1, a compilation album by Quality Control Music
- A song from Summer Girl, the fifth LP from Smash Mouth
