= CIAE =

CIAE may refer to:

- Central Institute of Agricultural Engineering, Bhopal
- China Institute of Atomic Energy
- Centre Interarmées des Actions sur l’Environnement, see Psychological warfare § France
