= Zirconium phosphate =

Zirconium phosphates (zirconium hydrogen phosphate) are acidic, inorganic cation exchange materials that have a layered structure with formula Zr(HPO_{4})_{2}·nH_{2}O. These salts have high thermal and chemical stability, solid state ion conductivity, resistance to ionizing radiation, and the capacity to incorporate different types of molecules with different sizes between their layers. There are various phases of zirconium phosphate which vary in their interlaminar spaces and their crystalline structure. Among all the Zirconium phosphate phases the most widely used are the alpha (Zr(HPO_{4})_{2}·H_{2}O) and the gamma (Zr(PO_{4})(H_{2}PO_{4})·2H_{2}O) phase. The salts have been widely used in several applications such as: drug delivery, catalysis, nanocomposite, nuclear waste management, clinical dialyzer, among others.

== Crystal structure ==
Zirconium phosphate crystal structure was elucidated by Clearfield and coworkers in 1968 by the single-crystal method. The layered structure of α-Zirconium phosphate consists of Zr(IV) ions situated alternately slightly above and below the ab plane, forming an octahedron with the oxygen atoms of the tetrahedral phosphate groups. Of the four oxygen atoms in the phosphate groups, three are bonded to three different Zr atoms, forming a cross-linked covalent network. The fourth oxygen atom of the phosphate is perpendicular to the layer pointed toward the interlayer region. In the interlayer region is localized a zeolitic cavity where a basal water molecule resides, forming a hydrogen bond with the OH group of the phosphate that is perpendicular to the layer. The alpha phase of zirconium phosphate is under the P21/n space group, with cell dimensions of a = 9.060 Å, b = 5.297 Å, c = 15.414 Å, α = γ = 90°, β = 101.71° and Z = 4.21 The basal interlayer distance for the α-Zirconium phosphate is 7.6 Å, where 6.6 Å is the layer thickness and the remaining 1 Å space is occupied by the interstitial water molecules in the interlayer gallery. The distance between adjacent orthophosphates on one side of the layer is 5.3 Å. There are two phosphates in each ab plane in the surface layer forming a “free area” of 24 Å^{2} associated to each phosphate group.

For the gamma phase (γ-Zirconium phosphate), an appropriate single crystal for single-crystal structure determination has yet to be obtained. In 1995 Clearfield and coworkers elucidated its structure using X-ray powder diffractometry (XRPD) and the Rietveld refinement method. The structure of γ-Zirconium phosphate consists of Zr(IV) atoms octahedrally coordinated to four different oxygen atoms of an orthophosphate. The other two resting octahedral position of the Zr(IV) atoms are occupied by two different dihydrogen phosphate groups. The orthophosphate molecules are located alternatively above and below the ab main plane and the dihydrogen phosphates are in the layer edges crosslinked by two of their oxygen atoms to two different zirconium atoms. The remaining two hydroxyl groups of the dihydrogen phosphate are pointing toward the interlayer gallery forming a pocket where a hydrogen bond is formed with the interlayer water molecules. The basal interlayer distance for γ-Zirconium phosphate is 12.2 Å, and the area surrounding the dihydrogen phosphate on the surface of the layers is 35 Å^{2}.
