= Tereza Khristoforovna Margulova =

Teresa Christoforovna Margulova (Russian: Маргулова, Тереза Христофоровна) (1912–1994) was a Soviet scientist, professor, and the founder of the Department of Nuclear Power Stations of the Moscow Power Engineering Institute. She was born on August 14, 1912, and grew up in Baku. After graduating from the Azerbaijan Industrial Institute, she continued her education in a PhD program at The Moscow Power Engineering Institute (MPEI - in Russian: МЭИ).

== Biography ==
For most of her life, Margulova was associated with MPEI. She lectured until 1956 at the department of boilers and was promoted from assistant lecturer to professor while working on her doctoral dissertation, earning her doctoral degree. Her research has been associated with the development of one of the key implementation issues of ultra high heat engineering: the creation of a reliable and efficient chemical water treatment of heat transfer circuits of boilers.

Her research results used to be widely practiced in nuclear power stations (Leningrad and Chernobyl), naval vessels' nuclear power plants, including Nuclear Icebreaker "Lenin," and Thermal Power Stations (Kostroma GRES). Margulova was directly involved in the implementation of the latest technology in Power Engineering.

In 1956 Margulova began to actively deal with the retraining of specialists and the improvement of technological processes for the nuclear power industry. That year, she also started the world's first college and university department of Nuclear Power Plants. She was the head of the department for many years, and during her last years as a professor, five students from the fifth year of the Heat Power Department (TEF) were recruited to specialize in "Nuclear Power Plants" (NPP - in Russian: АЭС) when the NPP department began and a year later were the first to graduate from that field. All methods developed in the NPP of MPEI have led to the creation of similar departments and disciplines in higher education of Soviet Bloc countries, which Teresa was personally involved with. For the textbook Nuclear Power Plants in 1971, Margulova was awarded The State Prize. All generations of The Atomic Eastern Bloc Nuclear Engineers grew up with this book.

At NPP, Margulova also led international courses for retraining engineering graduates to work in the nuclear power industry in Russia, other republics of The USSR, and many foreign countries.

Margulova was a leader in the development of scientific methods and their practical implementation in many areas of Thermal Plant Heat Exchange Systems, Water Chemistry, and Technology of Materials. One of these technologies was awarded The State Prize in 1978.

For several years, Margulova served as the Dean of the Chairperson of Thermal Power Plants and later as a Deputy Director of MPEI. She was a member of The Scientific and Technical Councils of several government departments, agencies, and editorial boards, including the deputy chief editor of the Power Plant Engineering magazine.

Margulova's work was rewarded with many government awards: "The Order of Lenin" and " The Order of Honor," and twice she was awarded the State Prize. In 1981, Margulova was awarded the title "Honored Scientist of The Russian Federation." In 1993, she was among the first to be elected an honorary member of The International Academy of Engineering. Margulova was also awarded Honorary Doctorates from foreign universities: Budapest University of Technology and The Graduate School of Engineering in Zittau (Germany).

Under the direction of Margulova, more than 70 Ph.D. dissertations and 6 doctoral dissertations were earned. Many teachers and scientists in Russia and other countries consider themselves to be her students and followers. Margulova has published about 300 scientific papers and around two dozen books.

== Publications ==
- Boiler Generator and Heat Generator (1956)
- Nuclear Power Stations (1978)
