= Central Institute of Agricultural Engineering, Bhopal =

Research center in Bhopal, India

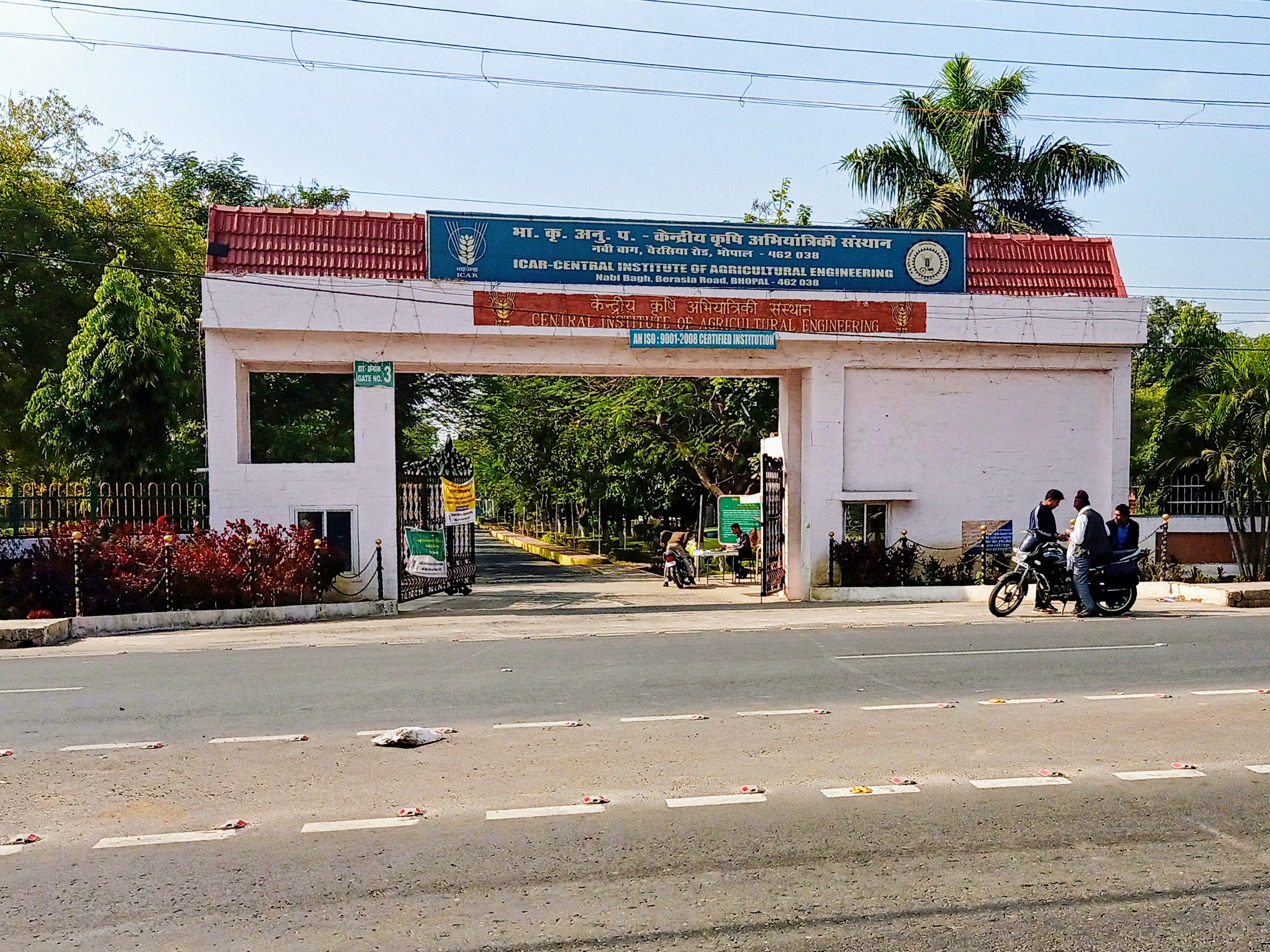
- Other names: CIAE
- Type: Registered Society
- Established: 1976; 50 years ago
- Director: C. R. Mehta
- Administrative staff: 440
- Location: Bhopal, Madhya Pradesh, India; 23°18′36.69″N 77°24′17.68″E
- Website: ciae.icar.gov.in

The Central Institute of Agricultural Engineering (CIAE) is a higher seat of learning, research and development in the field of agricultural engineering, situated in the lake city of Bhopal, Madhya Pradesh, India. It is an autonomous body, an Indian Council of Agricultural Research subsidiary, under the Ministry of Agriculture & Farmer's Welfare, Government of India.

== Profile ==
ICAR-CIAE was established on 15 February 1976 at Bhopal, with a view to provide a research platform for Agricultural Engineering. The early mandate was to address the areas of farm machinery, post harvest technology and energy in agriculture. However, the range of activity was later extended to cover Agro-Industrial Extension, Instrumentation and Irrigation and Drainage Engineering.

== Mandate ==
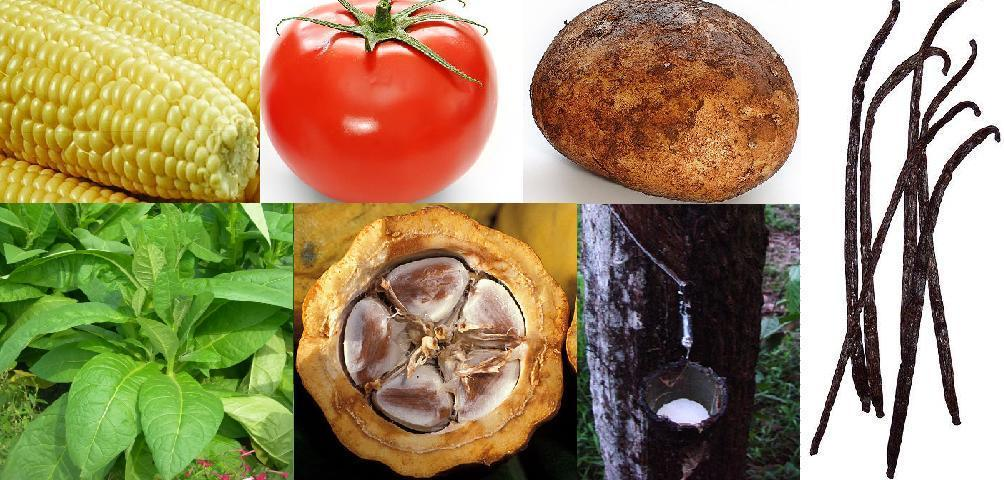
Domesticated plants

A fruit and vegetable market

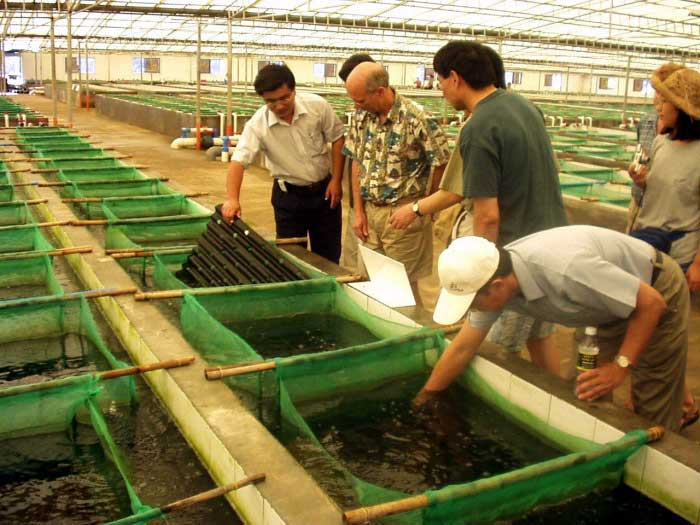
Abalone farm

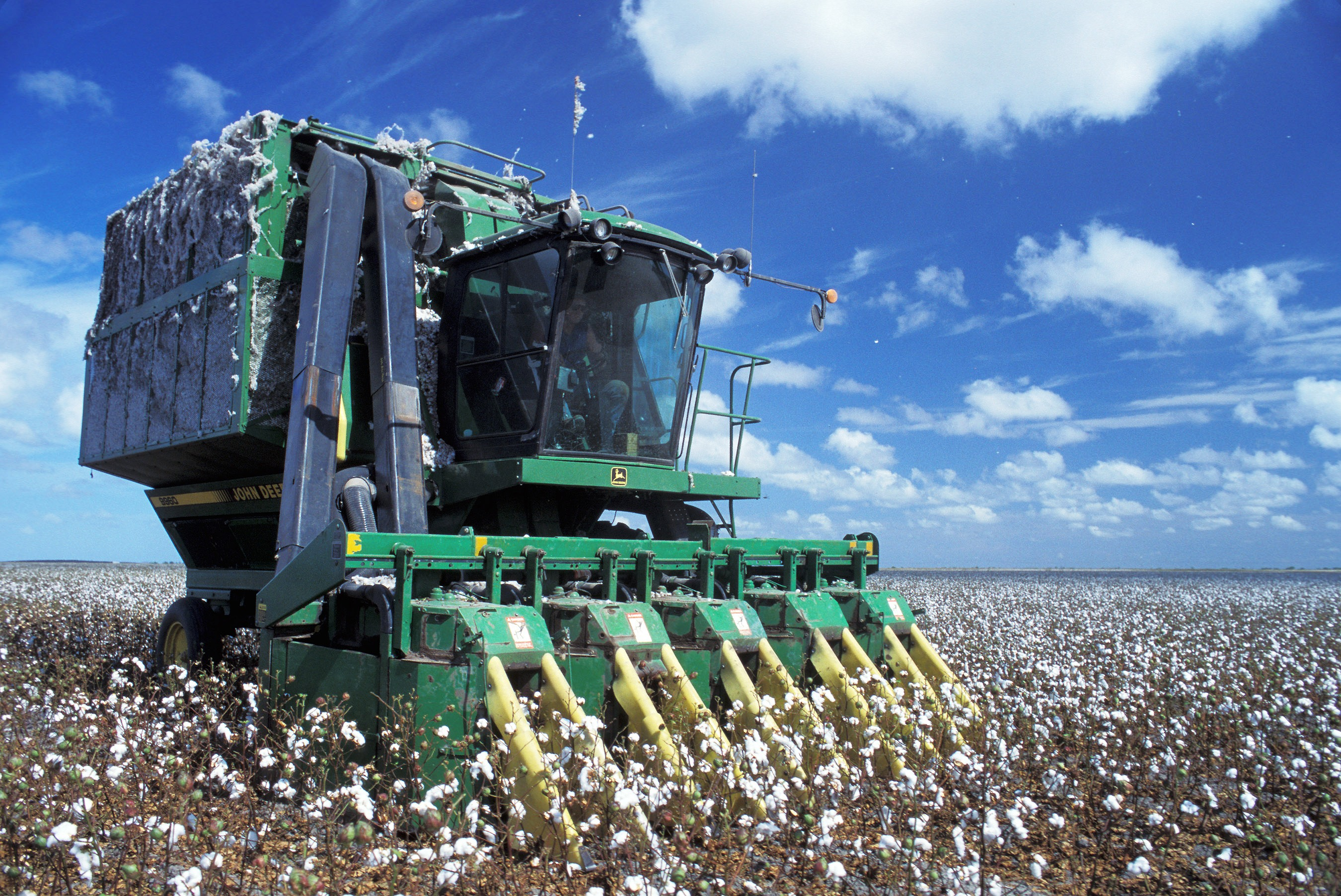
A cotton picker at work.

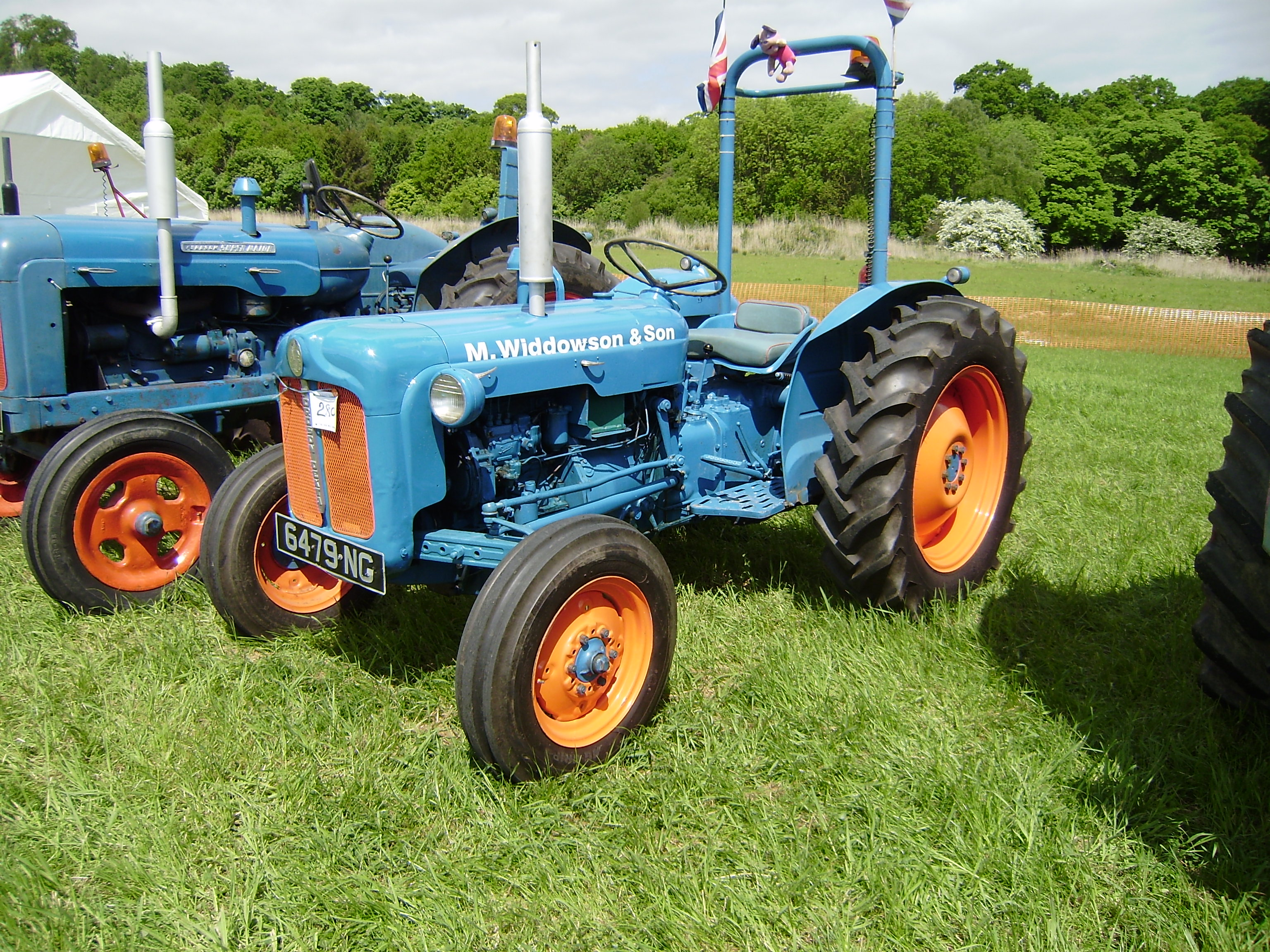
Rollover protection bar on a tractor

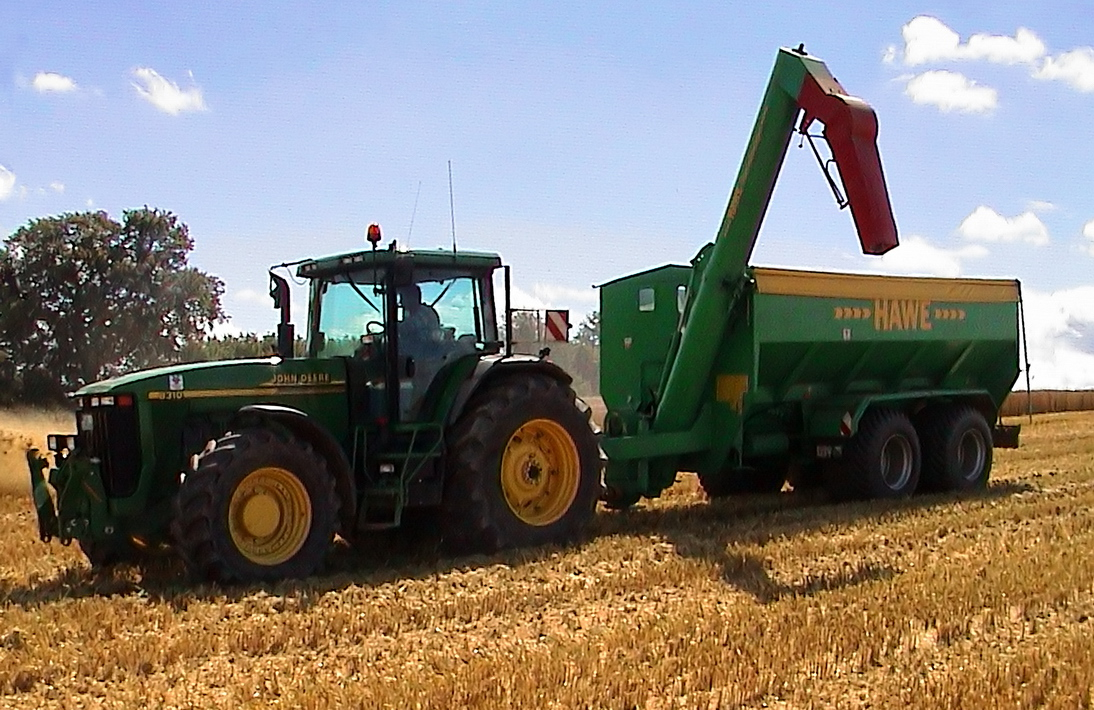
Tractor and chaser bin

CIAE was established with a mandate to:

1. Undertake adaptive, applied and basic research leading to development / improvement of equipment, technology, process for production, post- harvest technology and processing and energy use in agriculture and rural industries.
2. Develop hardware and technology in cooperation with other ICAR Institutes in the areas of crops, horticulture, aquaculture and animal husbandry for production and processing.
3. Provide leadership and co-ordinate network of research with state agricultural universities for generating location-specific technology and value addition.
4. Provide input to ICAR for policy interventions with respect to agricultural mechanization, energy management in agriculture, irrigation and drainage and post-harvest management.
5. Provide consultancy and undertake sponsored research for agricultural machinery industry and other organizations.
6. Act as a repository of information on agricultural engineering.
7. Act as a centre for training in research methodologies and technology and conduct graduate, post-graduate and doctoral research programs.
8. Collaborate with relevant national and international agencies in achieving the above objectives.

== Facilities ==
=== Research laboratories ===
CIAE is equipped with various laboratories:

1. Tillage and Soil Dynamics
2. Biochemistry and Microbiology
3. Seeding and Planting
4. Chemical Analysis and Quality Control
5. Plant Protection
6. Food Processing and Product Development
7. Animal Energy
8. Baking
9. Material Testing
10. Fermentation
11. Ergonomics
12. Pilot Plants
13. Cleaning, Grading and Milling
14. Bio-Fuel Energy
15. Food Engineering Properties and Drying
16. Mechanical Power
17. Oil Extraction
18. Irrigation Equipment Testing
19. Food packaging, handling and storage
20. Drainage Engineering

=== CIAE Research Farm ===
CIAE Research Farm covers an area of 92.66 hectares distributed for Crop cultivation, Orchards, Water harvesting ponds, Degraded waste land, Sports complex, Roads, Residential and non-residential buildings and a Meteorological observatory. The farm activities are divided into two sections namely Farm Production & Field Research Management Section and Landscaping, Gardening and Horticulture Section.

=== Research Workshop and Prototype Production Centre ===
The centre has a Prototype Production Workshop, equipped with machining, welding, grinding, press work, cutting and shearing, tool and die making and heat treatment facilities. The workshop is used for batch production of prototypes for multi-location trials and pilot introduction. CIAE has a Research workshop also catering to the needs related to fabrication of new designs of research prototypes and set-ups and refinement of existing designs.

=== Library ===
CIAE has a library which is open to the staff, extension workers and other university students coming under the MOU programs and is home to 11921 books, 4169 bound journals, 3405 reports/ bulletins, 98 CIAE publications, and 245 CD-ROMs. It is housed in an area of 5400 sq ft and subscribes to 135 journals, both Indian and foreign. It is also equipped with computer and related infrastructure.

=== Prioritization, Monitoring and Evaluation Cell (PME) ===
PME Cell in CIAE is an NAIP program, established on 1 June 2007, with a mandate to:

- Sensitization of policy makers, research managers, scientists and other stakeholders about PME.
- Inventorying of research resources (manpower and financial) and tracking their allocations by commodities, resources, regions, research programs.
- Interface with ARIS and IPR unit for strengthening database and other decision support system.
- Facilitate planning and monitoring of research programmes/Five Year Plan.
- Undertaking impact analysis of research, extension and education programmes and activities.
- Collaboration with NCAP on the identified research activities or any PME related work.
- Research Impact Assessment.

=== Agricultural Knowledge Management Unit ===
AKMU is the management unit of CIAE on matters related to computers, networking and other areas of digital technology. It maintains the Information and Communication activities of the Institute through modern infrastructure and home developed and outsourced software.

=== CAD cell ===
CAD Cell is staffed by personnel who oversee activities from production drawing to the stage of transfer of technology. The cell also provides training facilities on Computer-Aided Design.

=== Guest House and Trainees' Hostel ===
The institute also maintains a Guest House to accommodate 48 guests and as a Trainees' Hostel to house 32 trainees.

=== International Training Centre ===
The International Training Centre (ITC) at the Institute provides facilities for International training and Conferences. The centre has a conference hall and communication and accommodation facilities.

== Courses ==
CIAE is affiliated to the Indian Agricultural Research Institute and is accredited Indian Council of Agricultural Research by the New Delhi for its MTech course in Energy in Agriculture. It also extends its infrastructure facilities to students for research programs.

== Agricultural Technology Information Centre (ATIC) ==
CIAE is home to an Agricultural Technology Information Centre (ATIC), established in November 1999. The centre has a declared mandate to:

- Provide a single window delivery system for technology and products for accelerating the rate of adoption and for easy accessibility to end-users.
- Facilitate direct access for the visitors of the institutional resources available in terms of technology, advice, products etc. for reducing technology dissemination losses.
- Help farmers and entrepreneurs in problem solving and decision-making.
- Create a strong linkage between different research divisions / units and users of the technology .
- Provide an elaborative views of improved technologies through published literature and other communication materials such as audio and video facility.
- Provide mechanism for feed back from users to the institute.

The centre is engaged in the distribution of un-priced and priced publications, the sale of seedling and planting materials, bio-fertilizers, processed farm products, soy food products, fish feed and Video Cassettes/CDs, providing information through Agricultural Equipment Display Center, exhibitions and manufacturers' meet and the collection of feedback and its transmission.

== Research and development ==
Research and development activities at CIAE may be classified into three major heads:

1. Technologies Developed
2. Institutional Projects
3. Externally Funded Projects

=== Technologies developed ===
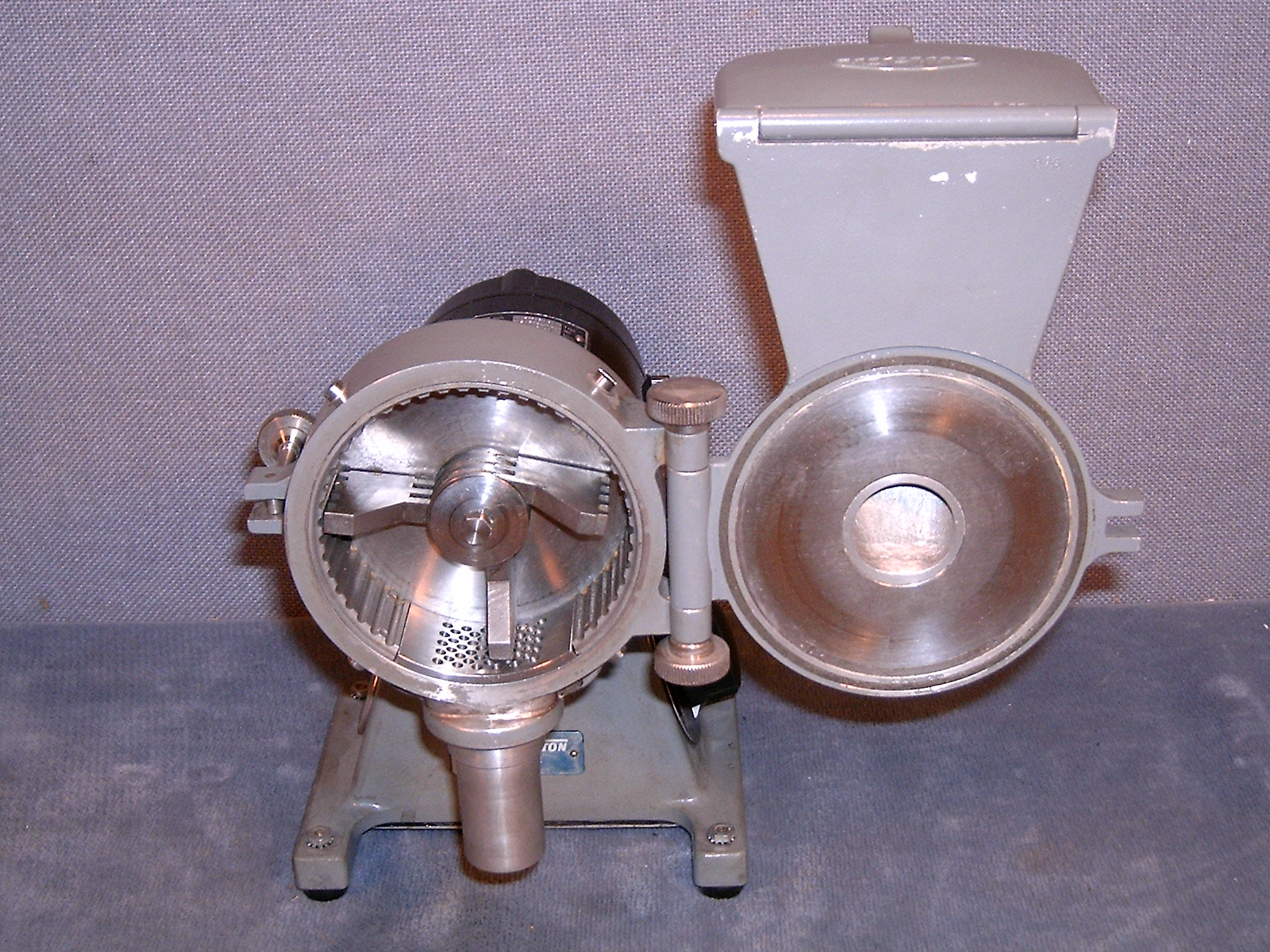
Hammer Mill

CIAE is credited with the development of several agricultural and related equipment.

- Tillage Equipment
- Sowing and Planting Equipment
- Weeding & Interculture Equipment
- Harvesting Equipment
- Threshing Equipment
- Cleaning/Grading/Separation Equipment
- Shelling/Dehulling/Peeling Equipment
- Milling Equipment
- Value Addition Equipment
- Energy Gadgets

=== Institutional projects ===
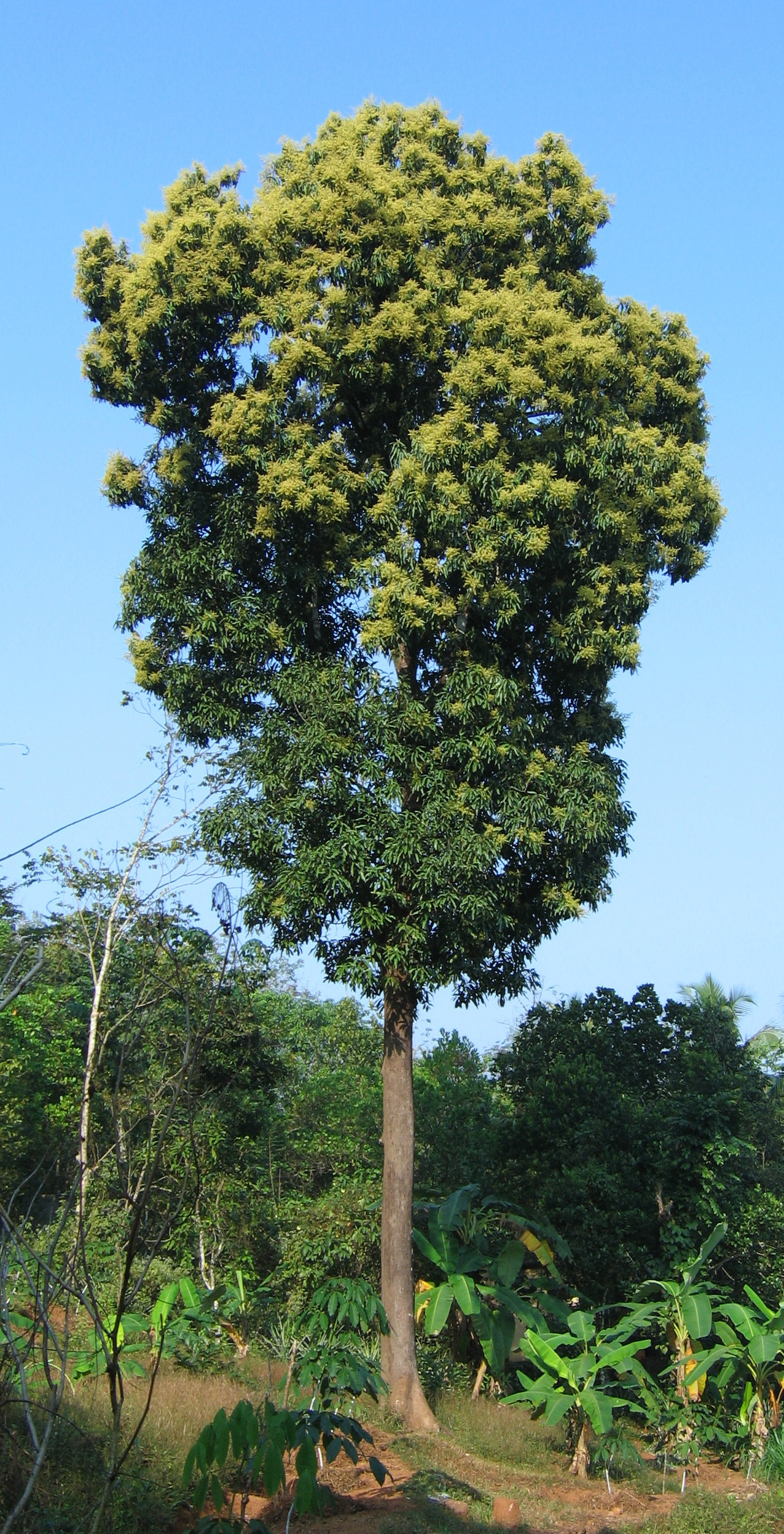
A mango tree in full bloom

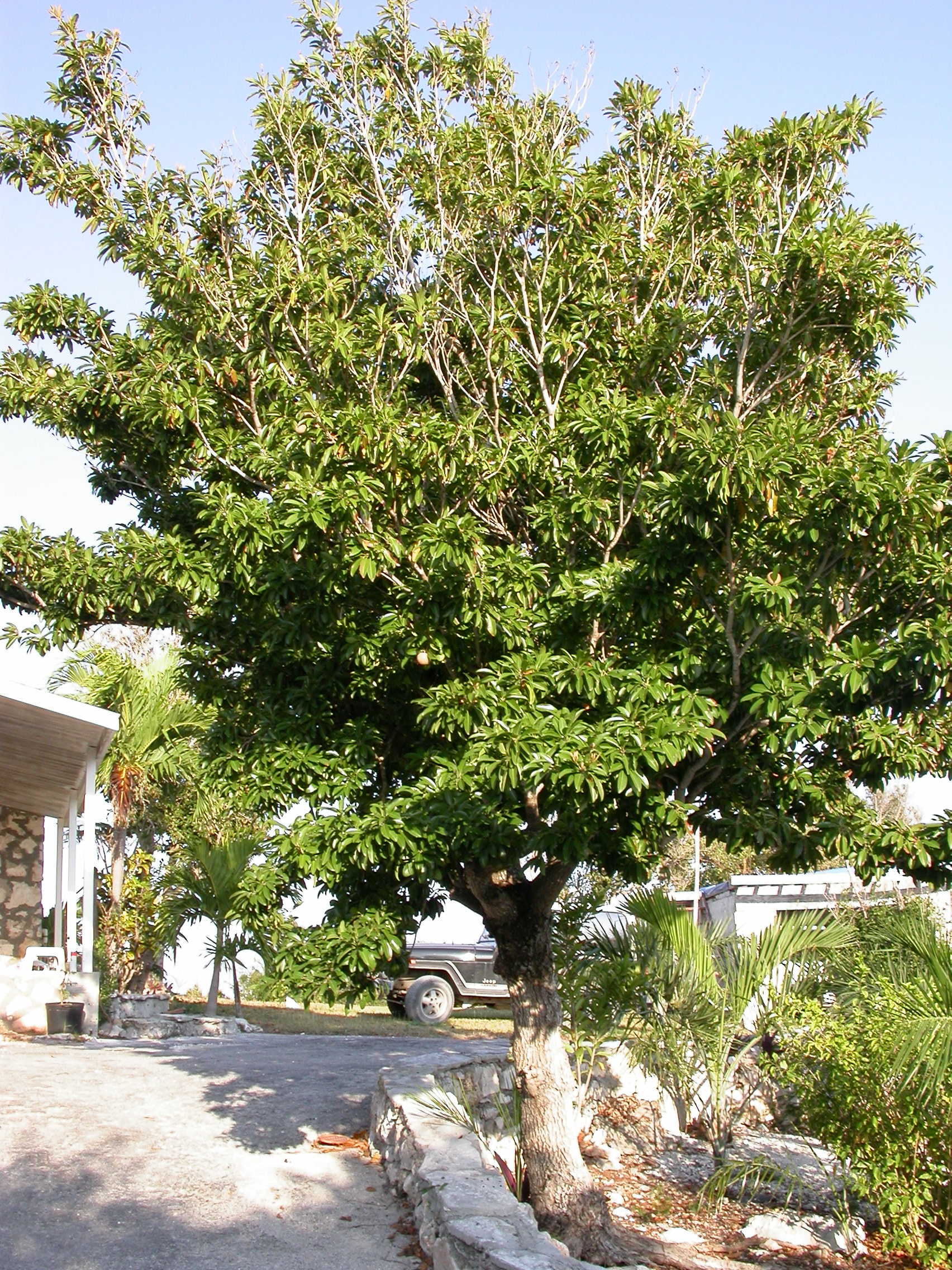
Sapodilla tree

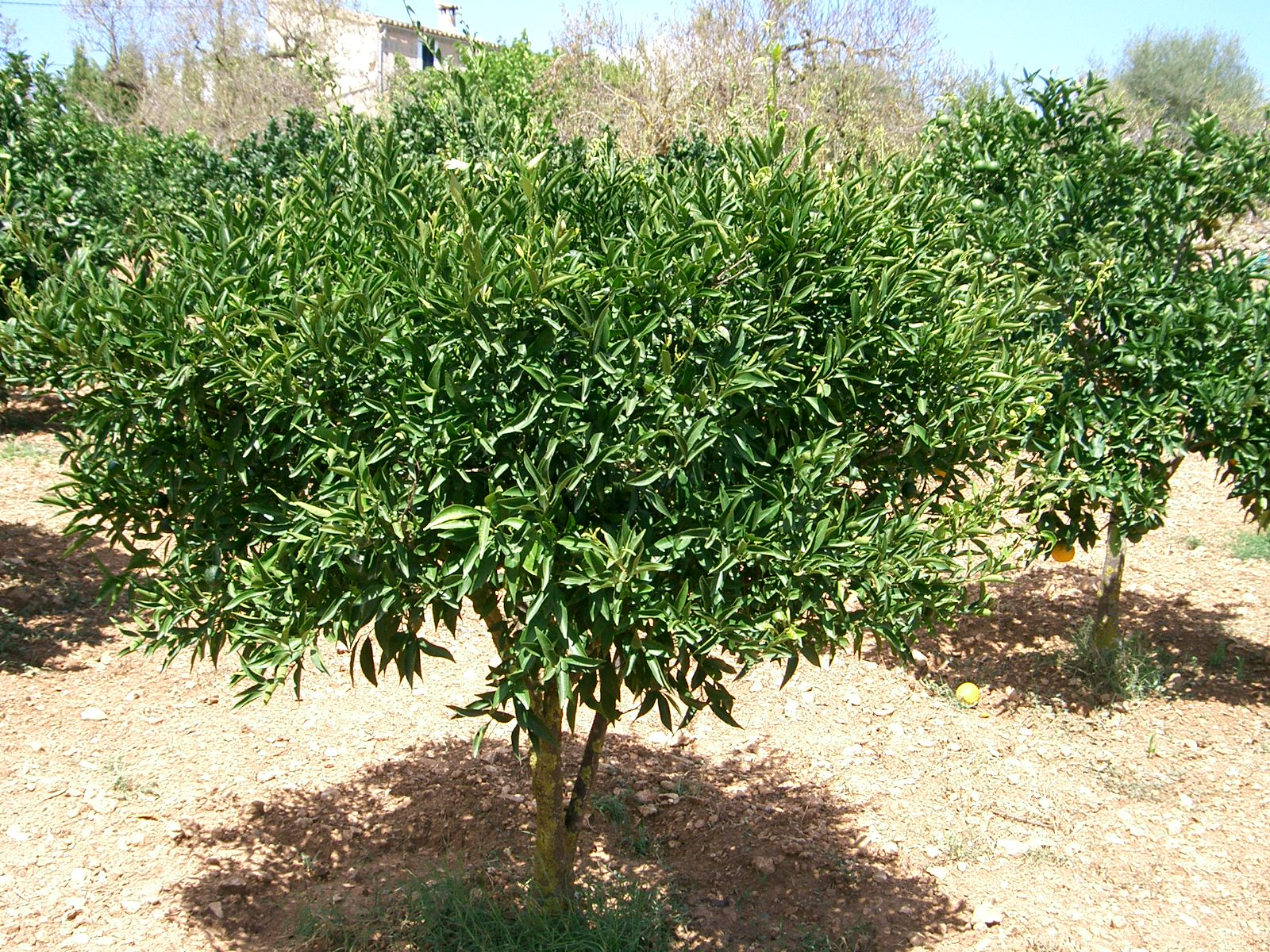
Citrus plantation

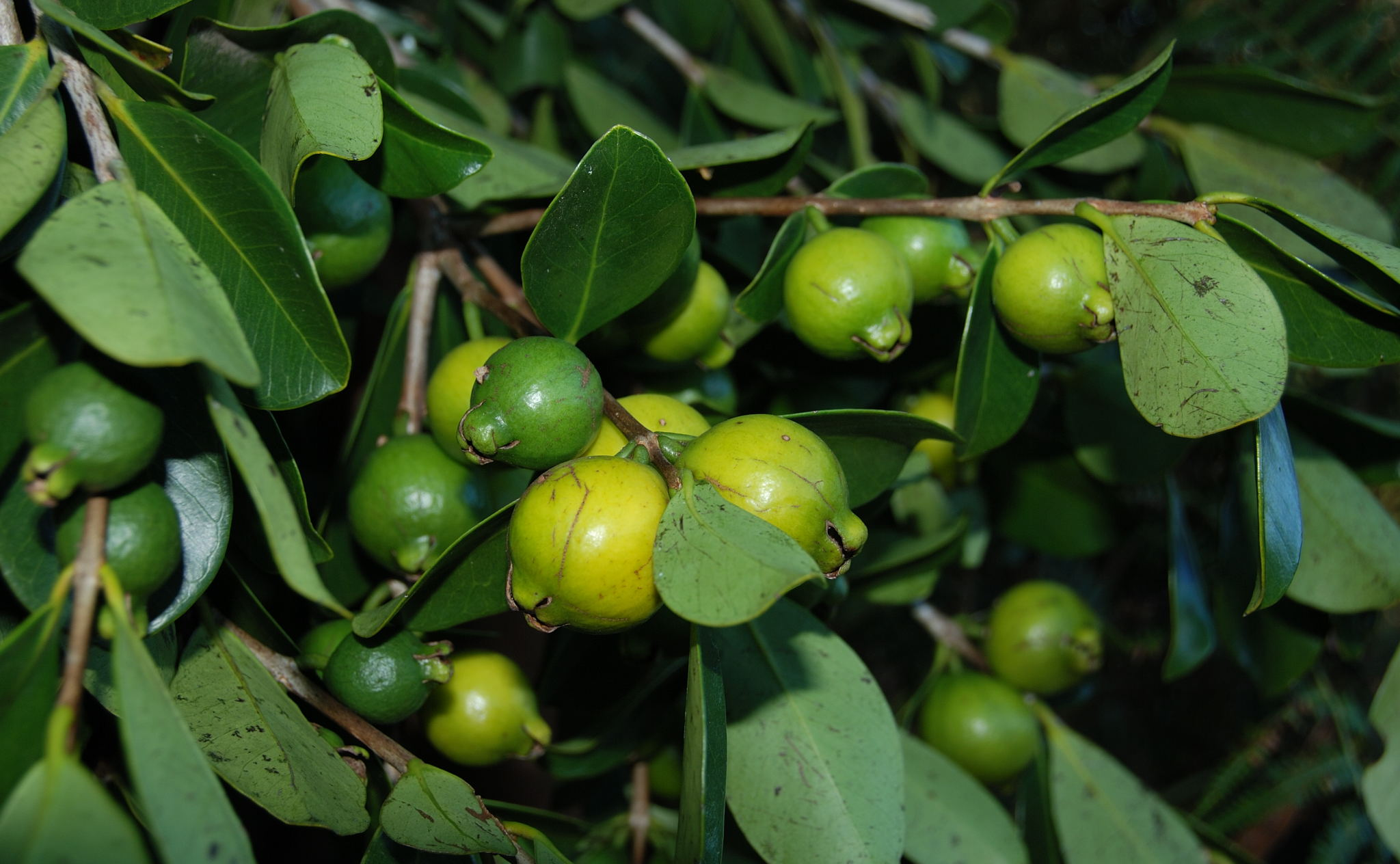
Yellow-fruited Cherry Guava

CIAE has lined up a series of regular research projects where research fellows and students can participate. The below mentioned list gives a bird's eye view of the research activities at CIAE on a regular basis.

- Tillage And Manure Interactive Effects On Soil Aggregates Dynamics, Soil Organic Carbon Accumulation And By Pass Flow In Vertisols
- Development of Efficient Spraying System To Reduce Spray Losses
- Development of spectral reflectance based prototype of variable rate urea application system for top dressing in rice and wheat crops.
- Adoption and resource assessment of agricultural machinery for resource conservation for permanent bed cultivation of cereals, pulses and oilseeds
- Draft requirement of selected farm implements operating in vertisol for tractor implement matching.
- Development of platform type fruits harvesting system for mango, sapota and citrus
- Design and development of mechanized pruner for high density guava orchard
- Design and development of two stage furrow opener in seed-cum-fertilizer drill for application of seed and fertilizer at appropriate depth
- Design and development of multi millet thresher
- Design and development of Arecanut (Careca Catech Linn) sheath size reduction machine
- Demonstration of conservation agricultural machinery in selected village cluster of MP State
- Assessment of hearing impairment of tractor drivers
- Adaptation/development of system for harvesting Makhana in ponds

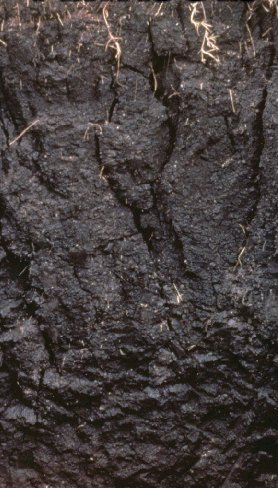

- Development of GPS Based variable rate granular fertilizer applicator for basal dose application
- Yield mapping through grain combine harvester fitted with yield monitors in soybean-wheat cropping system
- Design and development of zero till drill for sowing in heavy residue condition
- Development/adaptation of animal drawn garlic planter and digger
- Agricultural Accidents survey of Madhya Pradesh
- NAIP Sub-Project On A Value Chain In Major Seed Spices For Domestic And Export Promotion
- Development of soy and multigrain based nutritionally balanced functional foods for children (National Fellowship)
- Applications of modified atmospheric packaging techniques for shelf life extension of selected horticultural crops
- Process development for production of instant soymilk powder
- Adoption/refinement of technology for development of millet-soy-based functional foods and utilization of by-products
- Development of process and equipment for cleaning and dehusking of kodo and kutki minor millets
- Impact of defatted soy flour supplemented food products on health of children
- Soy-fortified functional foods for selected target groups
- Defatted soy flour for food uses – Survey of soybean industries and policy issues for soy food promotion
- Development of production of soy butter at pilot scale
- Study on health response of differently processed soy foods consumed in India
- Use of machine vision for distinguishing among crop varieties
- Technology for production of probiotic culture and development of probiotic soy cheese and soy milk powder
- Design and development of post harvest heating chamber and ripening chamber for banana
- Blending of millet flour with hydrocolloid for quality breads
- Estimation of post harvest losses in selected crops in four districts of MP
- Disinfestations of Grains using MW Energy [Approved in principle]
- Development of mechanization system for effective sett/bud treatment for sugarcane (Collaboration with SBI, Coimbatore
- Development of mechanization package for banana cultivation (Collaborative project with NRC Banana, Tiruchirapalli) [Agreed in principle]
- Development of banana central core stem slicer and juice extractor
- Studies on the mechanical processing of Moringa oleifera leaves [Approved in principle]
- Value Chain On Biomass Based Decentralization Power Generation For Agro-Enterprises
- Development of a system for purification and storage of biogas for engine application
- Studies on generation of bio-char from different crop residues
- Establishment of biogas cum solar energy based hybrid electricity generation system for dairy farm and allied activities [Approved in principle]
- Establishment of precision farming development center and its operation in Madhya Pradesh
- Fertigation Strategies for Fruit and Vegetable Crop(s) in Vertisols
- Development of 50 m2 greenhouse with provision for top opening
- ORP on soil moisture based micro-sprinkler (PC) irrigation
- Promotion of manufacturing of agricultural equipment through prototype production, capacity building and support to manufacturers/entrepreneurs
- Capacity building through trainings and outreach programmes
- Development of national database and its user-friendly retrieval system on commercially manufactured agricultural equipment/technologies
- Development of business model for custom hiring for different agro climatic zones
- Custom hiring business models and machinery packages for selected agro climatic regions of India [Approved in principle]
- Quantifying the mechanization status of selected cropping pattern in Madhya Pradesh
- Development/adoption of suitable harvesting device for oil palm
- Development of on the go soil electrical conductivity and pH measurement device
- Diffusion and adoption of crop production and farm engineering technologies for acceptability
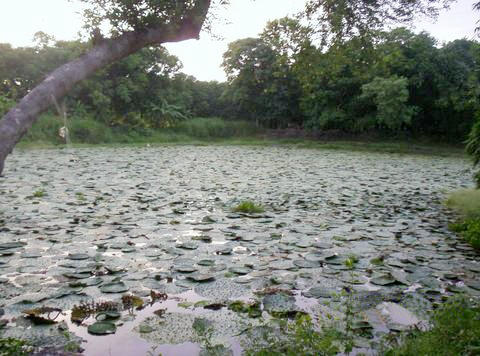
A pond of cultivated Euryale

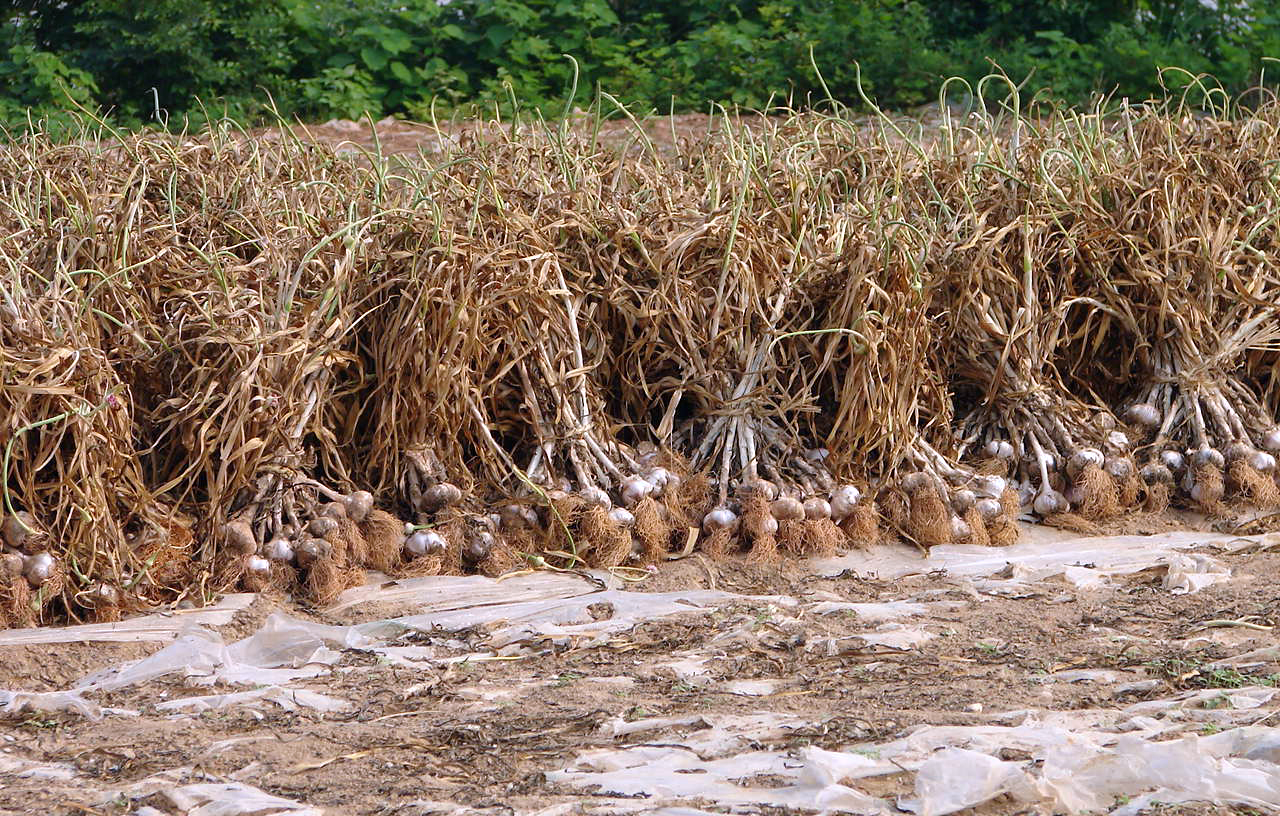
Garlic harvest

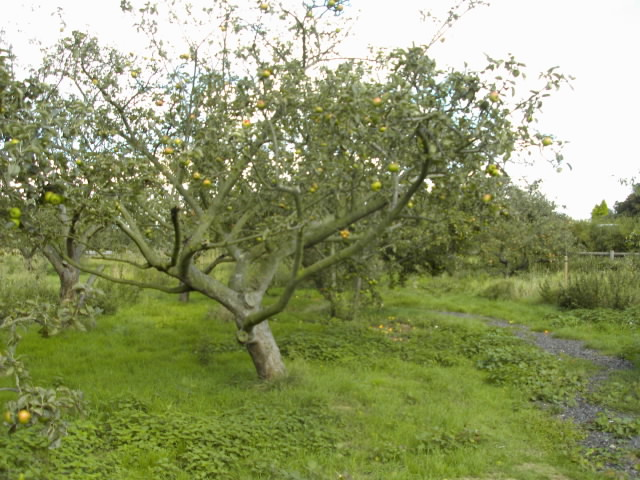
An orchard

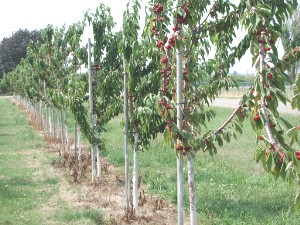
Sour cherry orchard

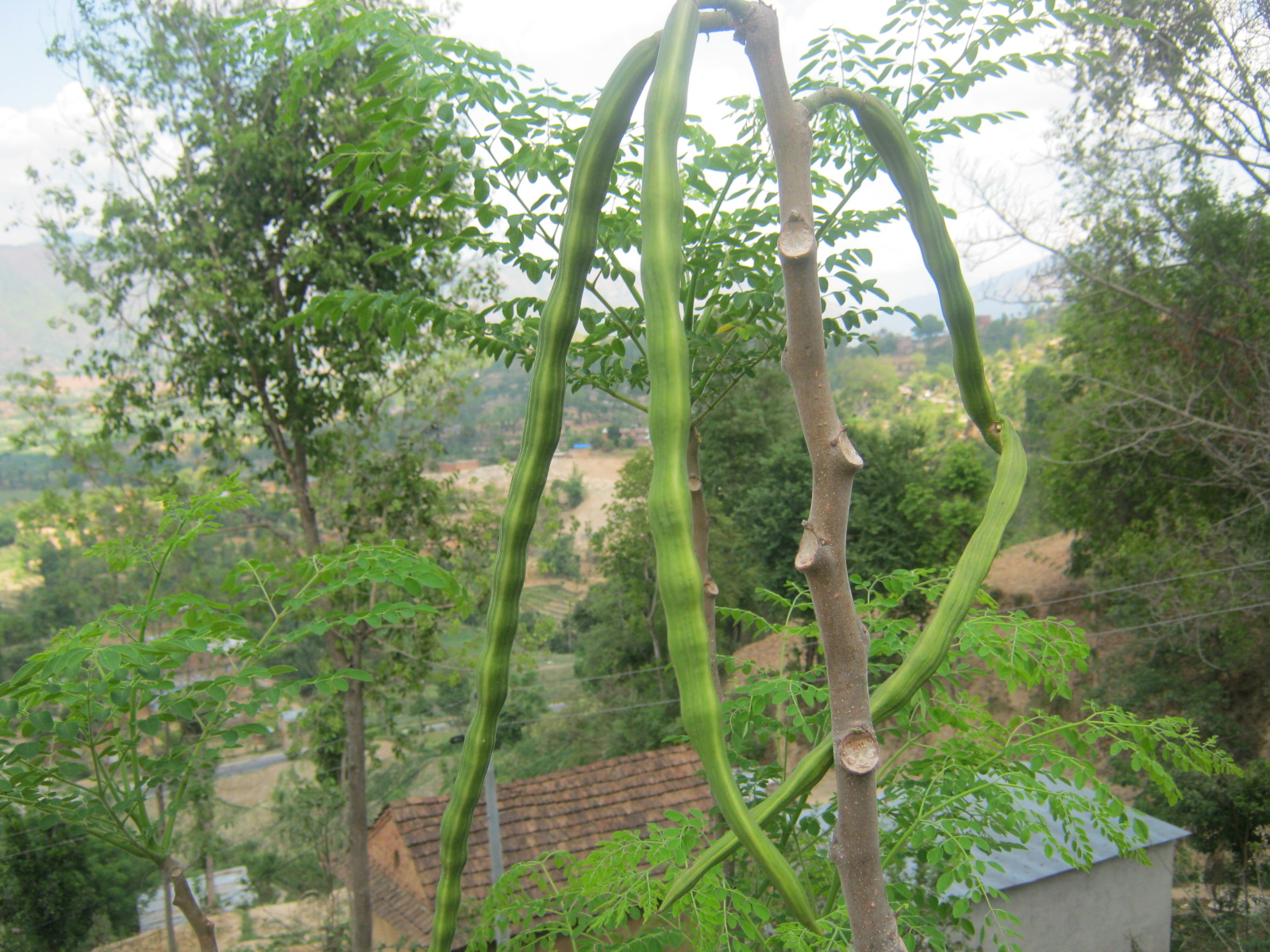
Pods of Moringa oleifera

=== Externally funded projects ===
CIAE has four types of externally funded projects.

==== NAIP project ====
CIAE hosts many National Agricultural Innovation Project (NAIP) projects.

- Value Chain on Biomass based decentralized power generation for agro enterprises.
- Precision farming technologies based on Microprocessor and Decision Support Systems for enhancement input application.
- Efficiency in production agriculture.
- Evaluation of X-ray, Computed Tomography (CT) And Magnetic Resonance Imaging (MRI) for detecting the internal disorders.
- A value chain in major seed spices for domestic and export promotion.
- Visioning, policy analysis and gender (Completed on 31/03/2012).

==== NICRA project ====
The National Innovations on Climate Resilient Agriculture (NICRA) was inaugurated on 2 February 2011 CIAE as one of core institutes with Strategic Research, Technology Demonstration, Capacity Building and Sponsored/ Competitive Grants were the main elements of the project. CIAE hosts the researches on enhancement of resilience of Indian agriculture to climate change and climate vulnerability.

The following are the ongoing R and D activities at CIAE under NICRA project:

- Adoption and performance assessment of agricultural machinery for resource conservation under permanent bed cultivation of soybean-wheat and maize-gram crops.
- Development of spectral reflectance based prototype of variable rate urea application system for top dressing in rice and wheat crops.
- Design and development of two stage furrow openers suitable for variable depth seed and fertilizer application in maize-wheat cropping system in central India
- Development of pre-emergence herbicide strip applicator as an attachment to sowing devices for wide spaced crops.
- Study of existing irrigation pumping system practices in Madhya Pradesh and suggestions if any for improving the performance.
- Investigation on entrained gasification of agro residue for power generation.
- Environmental impact assessment of different energy conversion processes for efficient utilization of surplus crop residues and Generation of bio-char from different crop residues.
- Self-sustainable energy management of dairy farm through efficient utilization of dairy residues.
- Demonstration and adoptive trials of conservation agriculture implements in selected village cluster of Madhya Pradesh state.

==== National Fund project ====
The National Fund for Basic, Strategic and, Frontier Application Research in Agriculture provides funding for various CIAE projects on the Use of machine vision for distinguishing among crop varieties. The research program aims to develop methodology for distinguishing among varieties/ germplasm of rice, Indian mustard, chickpea and okra using visible imaging and to optimize imaging and image processing parameters under visible spectral domain. Indian Agricultural Research Institute, New Delhi, National Bureau of Plant Genetics Resources, New Delhi and Centre for Development of Advanced Computing, Kolkata participate in the project.

==== National Fellow project ====
ICAR has placed a National Fellow Project at CIAE on the subject, "Development of Soy and Multigrain based nutritionally balanced functional foods for children". The project aims to eradicate malnutrition in children by making cost effective nutritious and easily assimilated food available to children. The main focus of the project in on the use of seasonal, local, low-cost and abundantly available raw food ingredients having high nutrition and functional properties like cereals, coarse cereals and millets, soybean, dairy ingredients and horticultural produce.

The main objectives of the project are:

- Development of cost effective nutritive functional foods with combination of locally available cereals, soybean, fruits, vegetables and dairy ingredients for children.
- Analysis of the products for nutritional, safety, quality and consumer acceptability attributes.

Optimisation of ingredients and process parameters for preparation of ready to eat mixes, snacks specially designed for children.

- Study of developed foods in selected districts through feeding trials on children.
- Dissemination of the technology through trainings and entrepreneurial development.

== Publications ==
CIAE has brought out many publications for students and general community.

- Non Thermal Non Chemical Processing in Food Systems. National Institute of Agricultural Engineering, Bhopal. 2012. ISBN 978-81-909305-2-9. Archived from the original on 31 March 2014.
- S Ganesan; et al. Agricultural Engineering Data Book. National Institute of Agricultural Engineering, Bhopal. Archived from the original on 31 March 2014.
- Dr P C Bargale and Dr S D Kulkarni (2010). Extruded Functional Foods using Plant and Dairy Ingredients. National Institute of Agricultural Engineering, Bhopal. ISBN 978-81-909305-1-2. Archived from the original on 31 March 2014.
- Dr L P Gite (ed.). Anthropometric and Strength Data of Indian Agricultural Workers for Farm Equipment Design. National Institute of Agricultural Engineering, Bhopal. Archived from the original on 31 March 2014.
- Dr S P Singh and Dr L P Gite; et al. Women Friendly Improved Farm Tools and Equipment. National Institute of Agricultural Engineering, Bhopal. Archived from the original on 31 March 2014.
- Dr S D Kulkarni Dr P C Bargale. Management of Soy based Enterprises. National Institute of Agricultural Engineering, Bhopal. Archived from the original on 31 March 2014.
- Dr A P Gandhi (ed.). Highlights of Achievements of Soybean Processing and Utilization Centre. National Institute of Agricultural Engineering, Bhopal. Archived from the original on 31 March 2014.
- Er Dushyant Singh and Dr A C Saxena. Directory of Agricultural Machinery Spares. National Institute of Agricultural Engineering, Bhopal. Archived from the original on 31 March 2014.
- Dr Dipankar De Comp and; et al. National Conference on Bio Diesel Technologies and Strategies for Rural Application. National Institute of Agricultural Engineering, Bhopal. Archived from the original on 31 March 2014.
- Dr Dipankar De. Energy use in Crop Production System in India. National Institute of Agricultural Engineering, Bhopal. Archived from the original on 31 March 2014.
- C I A E Bhopal. Proceedings of the National Working Group Meeting on Mechanization Needs of Horticulture and Hill Agriculture for Production and Post Production Operations and Value Addition. National Institute of Agricultural Engineering, Bhopal. Archived from the original on 31 March 2014.
- Dr A C Varshney; et al. Data Book for Agricultural Machinery Design. National Institute of Agricultural Engineering, Bhopal. Archived from the original on 31 March 2014.
- Dr H S Biswas. A Review on Rice Transplanters and Pre Germinated Paddy Seeders 2nd edition. National Institute of Agricultural Engineering, Bhopal. Archived from the original on 31 March 2014.
- Dr K C Bhardwaj; et al. Materials for Fabrication of Agricultural Machines. National Institute of Agricultural Engineering, Bhopal. Archived from the original on 31 March 2014.
- Er Jai Prasad; et al. Technology and Equipment for Harvesting Cleaning and Ginning of Cotton. National Institute of Agricultural Engineering, Bhopal. Archived from the original on 31 March 2014.
- Dr G Singh and Shri Hukum Chandra. Production and Economic Factors Growth in Indian Agriculture. National Institute of Agricultural Engineering, Bhopal. Archived from the original on 31 March 2014.
- Dr K C Bhardwaj. Materials and Manufacturing Processes for Agricultural Machines. National Institute of Agricultural Engineering, Bhopal. Archived from the original on 31 March 2014.
- Dr G Singh and Dr R C Singh. Harnessing Animal Power. National Institute of Agricultural Engineering, Bhopal. Archived from the original on 31 March 2014.
- Dr Anwar Alam and Dr G Singh. Status and Future Needs of Farm Mechanisation and Agro Processing in India. National Institute of Agricultural Engineering, Bhopal. Archived from the original on 31 March 2014.
- Dr R N S Yadav. Machinery for Sugarcane Production. National Institute of Agricultural Engineering, Bhopal. Archived from the original on 31 March 2014.
- Dr G Singh. Research Development and Technology Dissemination. National Institute of Agricultural Engineering, Bhopal. Archived from the original on 31 March 2014.
- Dr A C Varshney; et al. Power Tiller Research and Industry in India. National Institute of Agricultural Engineering, Bhopal. Archived from the original on 31 March 2014.
- Dr G Singh. Farm Mechanization in Madhya Pradesh. National Institute of Agricultural Engineering, Bhopal. Archived from the original on 31 March 2014.
- Dr S D Kulkarni. Soy food based Entrepreneurship Development. National Institute of Agricultural Engineering, Bhopal. Archived from the original on 31 March 2014.
- Dr S S Deshpande Dr P C Bargale. For prevention malnutrition Soyakady. National Institute of Agricultural Engineering, Bhopal. Archived from the original on 31 March 2014.
- Dr D M Bhandarkar; et al. For agriculture Utpadl increases and stability in black water and soil management techniques. National Institute of Agricultural Engineering, Bhopal. Archived from the original on 31 March 2014.
- Dr K C Bhardwaj. Small sized construction agriculture Deepika. National Institute of Agricultural Engineering, Bhopal. Archived from the original on 31 March 2014.
- Dr G Singh. Increasing steps of mechanisation in Madhya Pradesh Agriculture. National Institute of Agricultural Engineering, Bhopal. Archived from the original on 31 March 2014.

Research Publications

- Publication No. 1
- Publication No. 2

== List of countries by agricultural output ==
Largest countries by agricultural output at market exchange rates according to IMF, 2014
Economy	Countries by agricultural output at market exchange rates in 2014 (billions in USD)
(01) China	973
(02) India	337
(---) European Union	332
(03) United States	193
(04) Indonesia	123
(05) Brazil	122
(06) Nigeria	98
(07) Russia	88
(08) Turkey	68
(09) Pakistan	61
(10) France	55
(11) Australia	55
(12) Japan	53
(13) Mexico	46
(14) Thailand	45
(15) Spain	44
(16) Italy	43
(17) Iran	43
(18) Egypt	41
(19) Malaysia	38
(20) Argentina	38
Rest of the World	1,966
The twenty largest countries by agricultural output at market exchange rates in 2014, according to the IMF and CIA World Factbook
