= Flow injection analysis =

Instrumental chemical analysis

Flow injection analysis (FIA) is an approach to chemical analysis. It is accomplished by injecting a plug of sample into a flowing carrier stream. The principle is similar to that of Segmented Flow Analysis (SFA) but no air is injected into the sample or reagent streams.

== Overview ==
FIA is an automated method of chemical analysis in which a sample is injected into a flowing carrier solution that mixes with reagents before reaching a detector. Over the past 30 years, FIA techniques developed into a wide array of applications using spectrophotometry, fluorescence spectroscopy, atomic absorption spectroscopy, mass spectrometry, and other methods of instrumental analysis for detection.

Automated sample processing, high repeatability, adaptability to micro-miniaturization, containment of chemicals, waste reduction, and reagent economy in a system that operates at microliter levels are all valuable assets that contribute to the application of flow injection to real-world assays. The main assets of flow injection are the well defined concentration gradient that forms when an analyte is injected into the reagent stream (which offers an infinite number of well-reproduced analyte/reagent ratios) and the exact timing of fluidic manipulations (which provide exquisite control over the reaction conditions).

Based on computer control, FIA evolved into Sequential Injection and Bead Injection which are novel techniques based on flow programming. FIA literature comprises over 22,000 scientific papers and 22 monographs.

== History ==
Flow injection analysis (FIA) was first described by Ruzicka and Hansen in Denmark in 1974 and Stewart and coworkers in United States in 1979. FIA is a popular, simple, rapid, and versatile technique in modern analytical chemistry, and widespread application in quantitative chemical analysis.

== Principles of operation ==
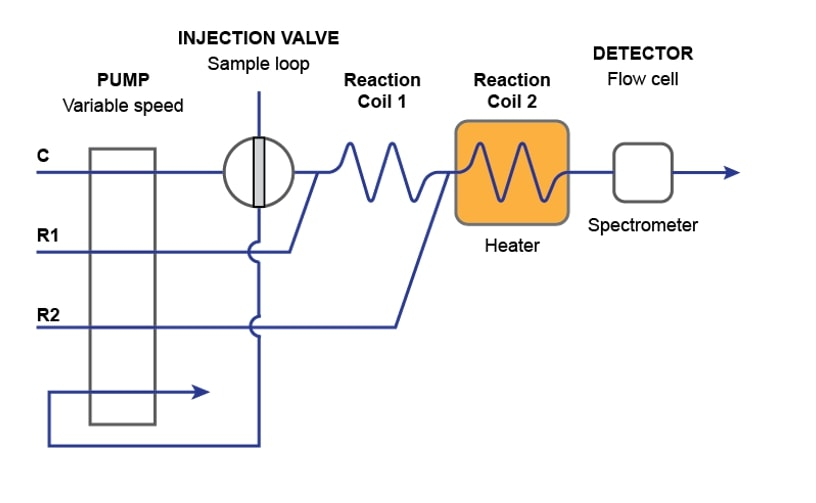
Diagram which depicts the basics of flow injection analysis

A sample (analyte) is injected into a flowing carrier solution stream that is forced by a peristaltic pump. The injection of the sample is done under controlled dispersion in known volumes. The carrier solution and sample then meet at mixing points with reagents and react. The reaction time is controlled by a pump and reaction coil. The reaction product then flows through a detector. Most often, the detector is a spectrophotometer as the reactions usually produce a colored product. One can then determine the amount of an unknown material in the sample as it is proportional to the absorption spectrum given by the spectrophotometer. After moving through the detector, the sample then flows to waste.

Detail of sample dispersion

When a sample is injected into the carrier stream it has the rectangular flow. As the sample is carried through the mixing and reaction zone, the width of the flow profile increases as the sample disperses into the carrier stream. Dispersion results from two processes: convection due to the flow of the carrier stream and diffusion due to a concentration gradient between the sample and the carrier stream. Convection of the sample occurs by laminar flow, in which the linear velocity of the sample at the tube's walls is zero, while the sample at the center of the tube moves with a linear velocity twice that of the carrier stream. The result is the parabolic flow profile, before the sample passes through a detector to a waste container.

== Detectors ==
A flow-through detector is located downstream from the sample injector and records a chemical physical parameter. Many types of detector can be used such as:

- spectrophotometer
- fluorimeter
- ion-selective electrode
- biosensors
- mass spectrometer

== Marine applications ==
Flow injection techniques have proven very useful in marine science for both organic and inorganic analytes in marine animal samples/seafood. Flow Injection methods applied to the determination of amino acids (histidine, L-lysine and tyrosine), DNA/RNA, formaldehyde, histamine, hypoxanthine, polycyclic aromatic hydrocarbons, diarrheic shellfish poisoning, paralytic shellfish poisoning, succinate/glutamate, trimethylamine/ total volatile basic nitrogen, total lipid hydroperoxides, total volatile acids, uric acid, vitamin B12, silver, aluminium, arsenic, boron, calcium, cadmium, cobalt, chromium, copper, iron, gallium, mercury, indium, lithium, manganese, molybdenum, nickel, lead, antimony, selenium, tin, strontium, thallium, vanadium, zinc, nitrate/nitrite, phosphorus/phosphate and silicate.

== See also ==
- AutoAnalyzer
- Colorimetric analysis
