= Joseph Williams Lovibond =

British brewer and inventor of colorimeter

Joseph Williams Lovibond (17 November 1833 – 21 April 1918) was a British brewer who developed the world's first practical colorimeter as a means of ensuring the high quality of his beer. He was the originator of the Degrees Lovibond scale.

== Biography ==
After accidentally losing his earnings from gold mining as a teenager, Lovibond went to work in his family's brewery. He discovered that coloration was a good index for assessing the quality of beer, and sought an accurate way of gauging colour. After failed experiments with paint, on solids, a visit to Salisbury Cathedral in 1880 gave him the inspiration to use stained glass for his colorimeter, which he introduced in 1885.

== Business ==
In 1885 he founded a company, The Tintometer Limited, to manufacture his colorimeter which was called the Lovibond Comparator. The company still exists and still produces an updated version of the Lovibond comparator.

== Publications ==
- Measurement of Light and Colour Sensations: A New Method of Investigating the Phenomena of Light and Colour by Means of the Selective Absorption in Coloured Glass, Graded into Scales of Equivalent Colour Value. Gill. 1894.
- Light and Colour Theories and Their Relation to Light and Colour Standardization. London: E. & F.N. Spon. 1915 – via Internet Archive.
- The Genesis of Colour. [With Plates.]. The Tintometer. 1915.
- The Tintometer: An Instrument for the Analysis, Accurate Measuring and Recording of All Colors (PDF). Tintometer Limited. 1904.

== Notes and references ==
- Kuehni, Rolf G.; Schwarz, Andreas (2007). Color Ordered: A Survey of Color Systems from Antiquity to the Present. Oxford University Press. ISBN 978-0-19-804088-0.
- Finlay, Victoria (2007). Color: A Natural History of the Palette. Random House Publishing Group. ISBN 978-0-307-43083-0.
- Fawcett, G S (1944). "Sixty years of colorimetry". Proceedings of the Physical Society. 56 (1): 8–21. Bibcode:1944PPS....56....8F. doi:10.1088/0959-5309/56/1/303. ISSN 0959-5309.
- Lovibond, J.W. (5 May 1891), Patent for Tintometer
