= Nessler cylinder =

Flat-bottomed laboratory tube made of glass

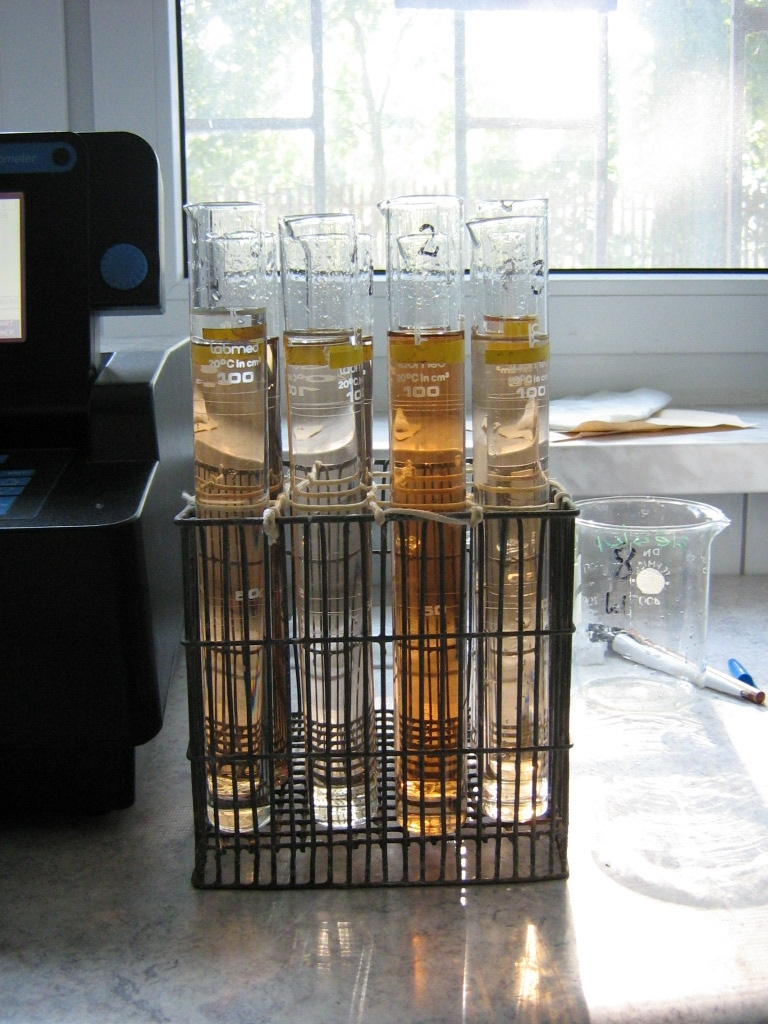
Determination of iron by a colorimetric method

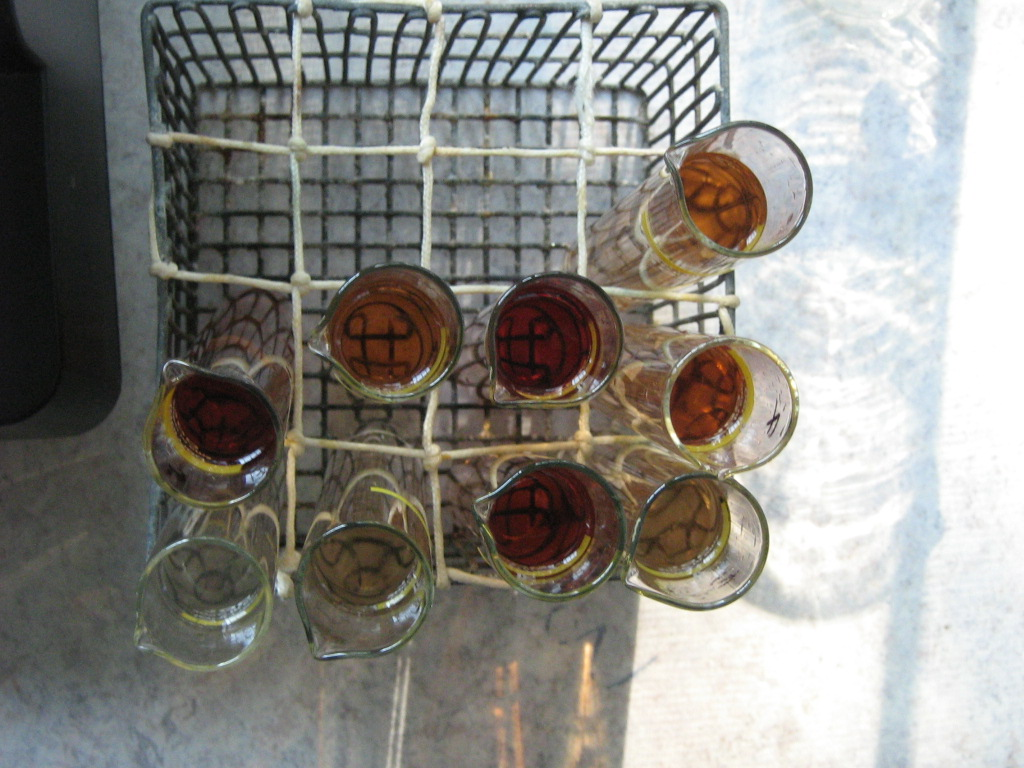
Determination of iron by a colorimetric method, top view

Nessler cylinders (also named color comparison cylinders or color comparing cylinders) are laboratory tubes with a fixed volume, made of glass with optically plane bottom. On the walls, there are marks of the nominal stroke volume (usually 100 ml) and possibly one halfway mark (usually 50 ml).

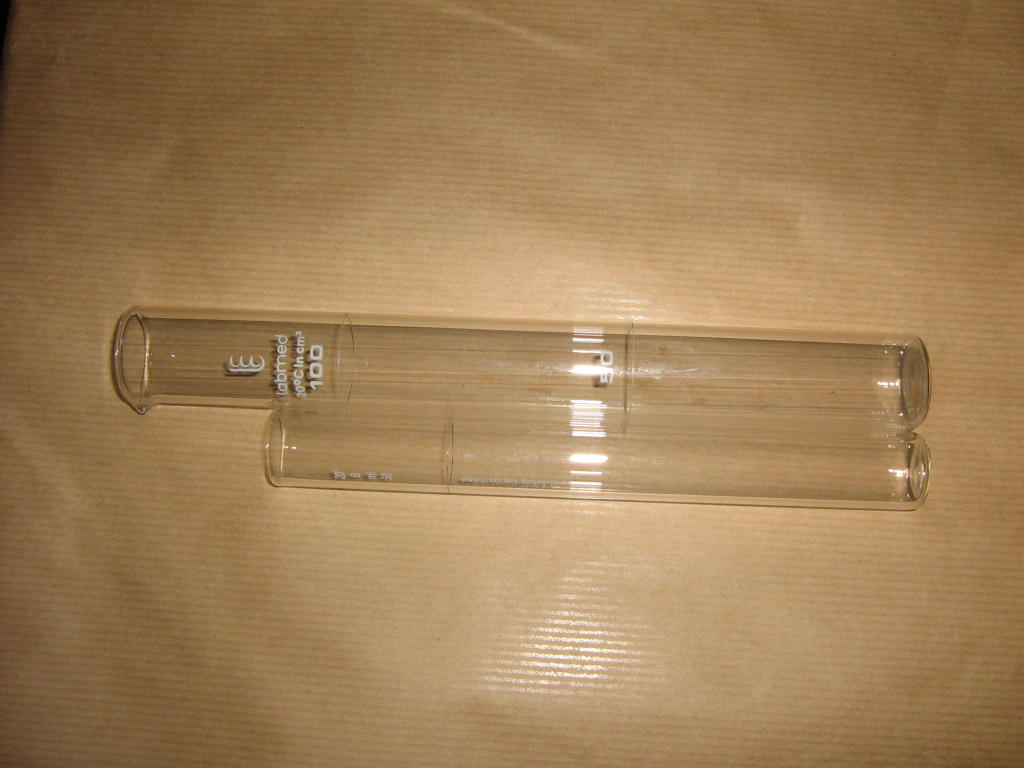
Nessler cylinders with a capacity of 100 cc and 50 cc

Nessler cylinders are used for colorimetric analysis, such as APHA color. The color of the substance contained in a Nessler cylinder is visually compared with the model. The tubes often carry out a series of calibrations of solutions of increasing concentrations, which functions as a comparative scale. To minimize differences in the subjective impression of the color of the solution of the substance to be analyzed, cylinders of a series should have the same characteristics - height, diameter, and thickness of glass. Basically, there are four types of used cylinders:

- high with a capacity of 50 ml (about 300 mm in height, approximately 21 mm in diameter)
- low with a capacity of 50 ml (about 175 mm in height, approximately 25 mm in diameter)
- high with a capacity of 100 ml (about 375 mm in height, approximately 24 mm in diameter)
- low capacity of 100 ml (about 210 mm in height, approximately 34 mm in diameter)

However, these parameters (except volume) can vary significantly between two cylinders.

Hehner cylinders differ in that they are scaled to full height.

Due to the spread of automated spectrophotometers, colorimetric assay methods using Nessler cylinders and visual assessment are used very rarely. However, Nessler cylinders are still used as reaction vessels, in the same way as test tubes.
