= MBAS assay =

Scientific testing method

A methylene blue active substances assay, or MBAS assay, is a colorimetric analysis test method that uses methylene blue to detect the presence of anionic surfactants (such as a detergent or foaming agent) in a sample of water. An anionic surfactant detected by the color reaction is called a methylene blue active substance (MBAS).

== Method ==
After first acidifying a water sample (with boric acid, for example), one adds to it chloroform and a solution of methylene blue. Methylene blue is a cationic dye. The biphasic solution is then agitated to distribute these reagents throughout the aqueous and organic phases. If an anionic surfactant is present, then the cationic methylene blue and the anionic surfactant forms an ion pair, which is extracted into the organic phase. The color saturation of the chloroform increases with the concentration of anionic surfactants.

== Standards ==
MBAS assay is an ASTM International standard technique for detecting anionic surfactants. These include carboxylates, phosphates, sulfates, and sulfonates. An MBAS assay alone does not, however, identify specific surfactants.

In 2011, ASTM retired ASTM D2330-02, the 2002 revision of the standard, which they reviewed and replaced with a new revision. As of 2026, the current revision of the standard is ASTM D2330-20, which was adopted on 24 February 2020.

The publication Standard Methods for the Examination of Water and Wastewater lists the following methods used by certified laboratories testing wastewater in the United States.

- Method 5540B describes surfactant separation by sublation.
- Method 5540C discusses anionic surfactants as methylene blue active substances (MBAS).
- Method 5540D discusses nonionic surfactants as cobalt thiocyanate active substances (CTAS).

== See also ==
- Colorimetry
- Surfactant
- Water chemistry analysis
- Water testing
