= Lovibond comparator =

The Lovibond comparator is an example of a colorimeter made in Britain by The Tintometer Ltd. It was invented in the 19th century by Joseph Williams Lovibond, a British brewer and chemist, as a tool to standardize the production of beer. Updated versions are still available.

== Description ==
The device is used to determine the color of liquids. A sample is put in a glass tube. The tube is inserted in the comparator and compared with a series of colored glass discs until the nearest possible match is found.

Among other things, the device is used to determine the concentration of certain chemicals in solution. In this use, some assumptions are made about what is in the sample. Given those assumptions, the concentration will be indicated by the disc which best matches the color of the solution.

There are a number of standard tests in which a sample to be tested is mixed with a color reagent. In such tests, the resulting color indicates the concentration of the sample under test (see Beer–Lambert law).

Results can be approximate, compared to other testing techniques, but the comparator is useful for field work because it is portable, rugged and easy to use. If a more exact measurement is required other tests can be conducted in a laboratory.

It may be used in chemistry laboratories to approximately measure the pH of a sample.
