= Tintometer =

English colorimetry company

The Tintometer Limited was founded in 1896 by Joseph Williams Lovibond, the son of a prominent brewery owner in Greenwich, London. J.W. Lovibond developed the world's first practical colorimeter as a means of ensuring the high quality of his beer. By the time of his death in 1918 he had established himself as a pioneer in the field of colour science and his company, The Tintometer Limited, was already known throughout the world for its range of instrumentation and expertise in the field of colorimetry. The company continued to grow in strength and as advances were made both in colour science research and in instrument development Lovibond standards became specific for many products worldwide.

== See also ==
- Degrees Lovibond
- Harold Horton Sheldon for a later invention of a colorimetric device.

== Sources ==
- The Tintometer Ltd
- Colour Measurement
