= Colorimeter (chemistry) =

Device that measures the absorbance of particular wavelengths of light

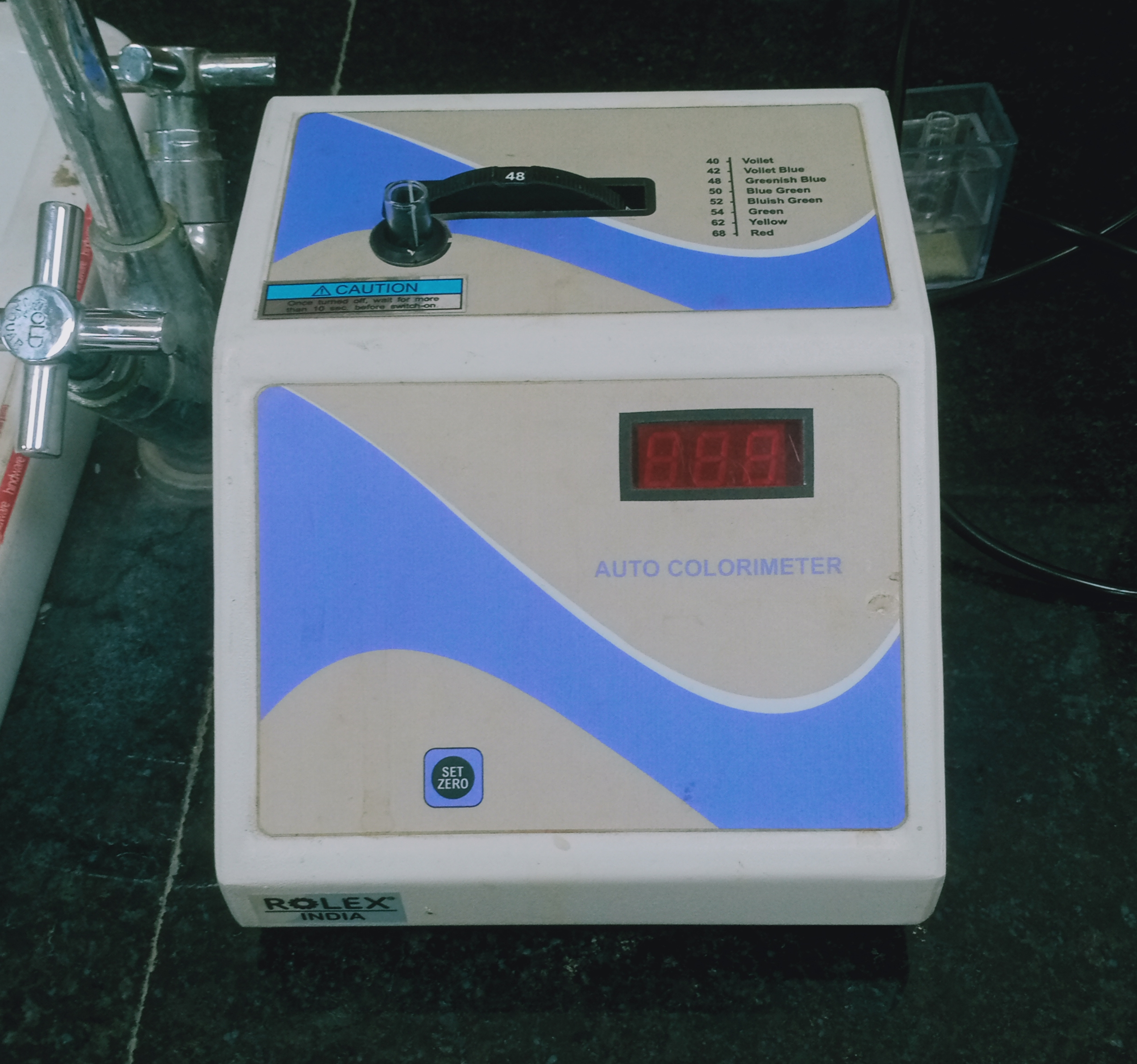
- An Auto colorimeter
- Uses: To test the concentration of a substance in a solution by measuring its absorbance of a specific wavelength of light

A colorimeter is a device used in colorimetry that measures the absorbance of particular wavelengths of light by a specific solution. It is commonly used to determine the concentration of a known solute in a given solution by the application of the Beer–Lambert law, which states that the concentration of a solute is proportional to the absorbance.

== Construction ==
(1) Wavelength selection, (2) Printer button, (3) Concentration factor adjustment, (4) UV mode selector (Deuterium lamp), (5) Readout, (6) Sample compartment, (7) Zero control (100% T), (8) Sensitivity switch, (9) ON/OFF switch

The essential parts of a colorimeter are:

- a light source (often an ordinary low-voltage filament lamp);
- an adjustable aperture;
- a set of colored filters;
- a cuvette to hold the working solution;
- a detector (usually a photoresistor) to measure the transmitted light;
- a meter to display the output from the detector.

In addition, there may be:

- a voltage regulator, to protect the instrument from fluctuations in mains voltage;
- a second light path, cuvette and detector. This enables comparison between the working solution and a "blank", consisting of pure solvent, to improve accuracy.

There are many commercialized colorimeters as well as open source versions with construction documentation for education and for research.

=== Filters ===
Changeable optics filters are used in the colorimeter to select the wavelength which the solute absorbs the most, in order to maximize accuracy. The usual wavelength range is from 400 to 700 nm. If it is necessary to operate in the ultraviolet range then some modifications to the colorimeter are needed. In modern colorimeters the filament lamp and filters may be replaced by several (light-emitting diode) of different colors.

=== Cuvettes ===
In a manual colorimeter the cuvettes are inserted and removed by hand. An automated colorimeter (as used in an AutoAnalyzer) is fitted with a flowcell through which solution flows continuously.

== Output ==
The output from a colorimeter may be displayed by an analogue or digital meter and may be shown as transmittance (a linear scale from 0 to 100%) or as absorbance (a logarithmic scale from zero to infinity). The useful range of the absorbance scale is from 0 to 2 but it is desirable to keep within the range 0–1, because above 1 the results become unreliable due to scattering of light.

In addition, the output may be sent to a chart recorder, data logger, or computer.

== Applications in Biochemistry and Diagnostics ==
In clinical laboratories, the colorimeter is commonly used to estimate various biochemical compounds in biological samples. In all methods where a colored product is formed in reaction with a specific analyte, the analyte can be quantitatively measured. For instance, it is used in the Folin–Wu method for measuring blood glucose, in which glucose is converted to a colored complex and absorbance is read at 680 nm; similarly, urea concentration in blood and urine is determined via enzymatic color reactions and color intensity is quantified by colorimetric measurement.

== See also ==
- Spectronic 20
- Spectrophotometer
- Lovibond Colorimeter
