= Harmonised monitoring scheme =

River monitoring programme

The Harmonised Monitoring Scheme is a long term river water quality monitoring scheme in the United Kingdom. The term is also used to refer to the long term data sets produced by the scheme.

== Establishment ==
The scheme was established in 1974 by the Department of the Environment with much of the initial planning and implementation undertaken by the Water Research Centre. It involved the creation of a network of sites across the UK. Most sites were at the downstream freshwater limits of the larger rivers although some of the largest rivers also included additional locations below major tributary confluences. Before inclusion of any location in the survey, homogeneity testing was carried out to characterise quality variations laterally and vertically within the river section chosen. For each designated point a specific sampling location was identified based on the results of the homogeneity exercise. In addition laboratories who were to undertake the analysis of samples were identified and a comprehensive AQC exercise was conducted to ensure comparability of data derived from the monitoring programme.

== Objectives ==
The scheme was originally intended to operate for 10 years from 1974 to 1984 to provide data to the Department of the Environment to permit the identification of national trends in water quality. However its duration was extended. It was formally discontinued in 2013, however in England many of the monitoring sites continue to be surveyed to describe long term water quality trends. It was also intended to satisfy the requirements of the EU decision on the exchange of monitoring data requirements.

== Operation ==
The scheme is administered by the Environment Agency in England, by Natural Resources Wales in Wales and by SEPA in Scotland and involves routine monitoring at 230 sites including 56 river systems in Scotland.

== Data ==
The data produced by the scheme provides a continuous and consistent record of quality of rivers across the UK for more than 30 years and can be used to demonstrate changes in water quality over that period.
