= Glycerol-3-phosphate oxidase =

glycerol-3-phosphate oxidase

Identifiers
- EC no.: 1.1.3.21
- CAS no.: 9046-28-0

Databases
- BRENDA: enzyme data
- ExPASy: NiceZyme view
- KEGG: enzyme entry
- MetaCyc: metabolic pathway
- Rhea: reactions
- PDB structures: RCSB PDB PDBe PDBsum
- Gene Ontology: AmiGO / QuickGO
Search
- PMC: articles
- PubMed: articles
- NCBI: proteins

In enzymology, glycerol-3-phosphate oxidase (EC 1.1.3.21) is an enzyme that catalyzes the chemical reaction

sn glycerol 3-phosphate
O_{2}
H_{2}O_{2}
O_{2}
H_{2}O_{2}
dihydroxyacetone phosphate

The two substrates of this enzyme are sn-glycerol 3-phosphate and oxygen. Its products are dihydroxyacetone phosphate and hydrogen peroxide.

This enzyme belongs to the family of oxidoreductases, specifically those acting on the CH-OH group of donor with oxygen as acceptor. The systematic name of this enzyme class is sn-glycerol-3-phosphate:oxygen 2-oxidoreductase. Other names in common use include glycerol phosphate oxidase, glycerol-1-phosphate oxidase, glycerol phosphate oxidase, L-alpha-glycerophosphate oxidase, alpha-glycerophosphate oxidase, and L-alpha-glycerol-3-phosphate oxidase. This enzyme participates in glycerophospholipid metabolism. It employs one cofactor, FAD.
