= AutoAnalyzer =

Automated analyzer using a flow technique

The AutoAnalyzer is an automated analyzer using a flow technique called continuous flow analysis (CFA), or more correctly segmented flow analysis (SFA) first made by the Technicon Corporation. The instrument was invented in 1957 by Leonard Skeggs, PhD and commercialized by Jack Whitehead's Technicon Corporation. The first applications were for clinical analysis, but methods for industrial and environmental analysis soon followed. The design is based on segmenting a continuously flowing stream with air bubbles.

== Operating principle ==
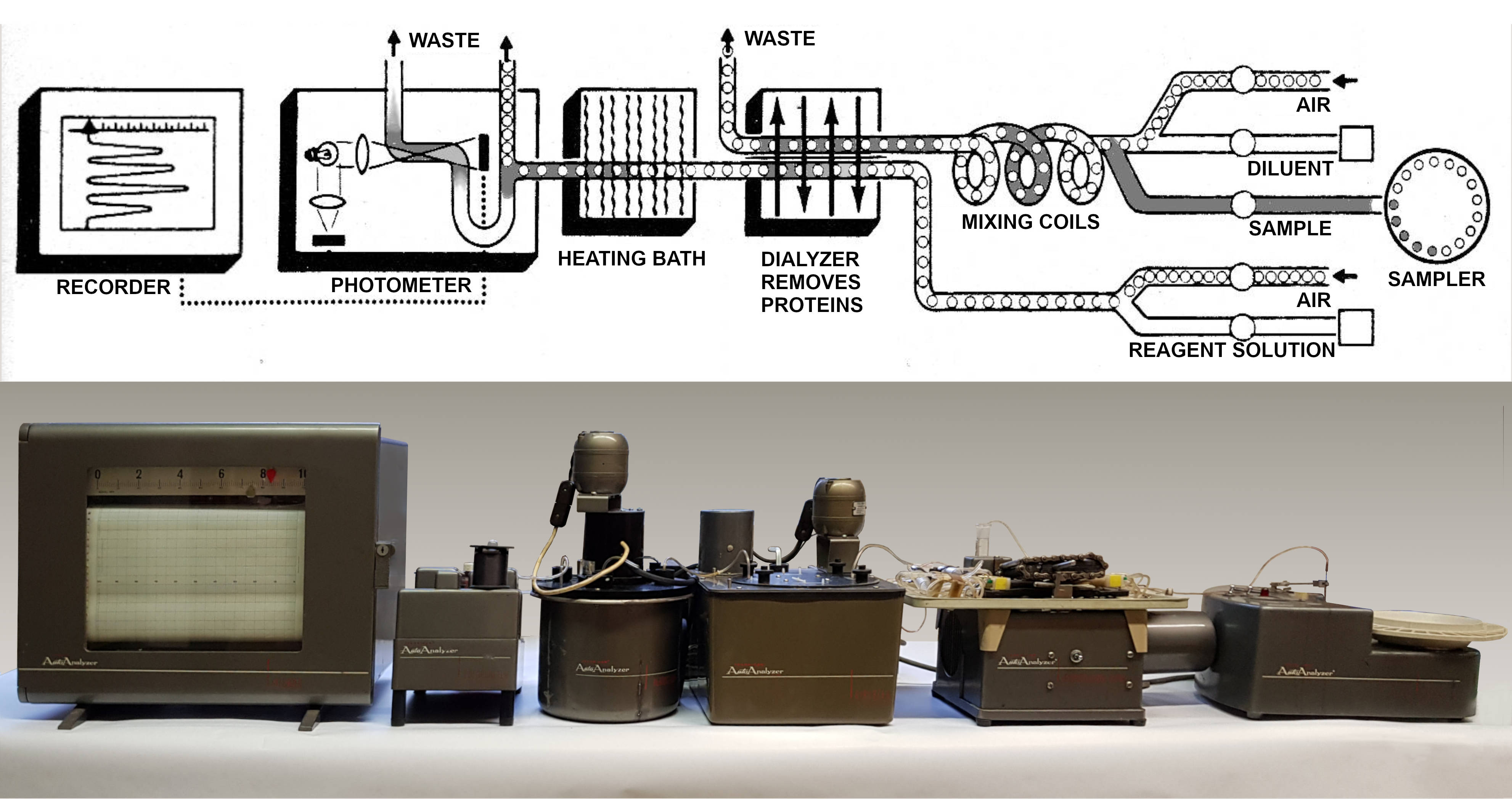
AutoAnalyzer I Technicon

Continuous flow analysis (CFA) is a general term that encompasses both segmented flow analysis (SFA) and flow injection analysis (FIA). In segmented flow analysis, a continuous stream of material is divided by air bubbles into discrete segments in which chemical reactions occur. The continuous stream of liquid samples and reagents are combined and transported in tubing and mixing coils. The tubing passes the samples from one apparatus to the other with each apparatus performing different functions, such as distillation, dialysis, extraction, ion exchange, heating, incubation, and subsequent recording of a signal. An essential principle of SFA is the introduction of air bubbles. The air bubbles segment each sample into discrete packets and act as a barrier between packets to prevent cross contamination as they travel down the length of the glass tubing. The air bubbles also assist mixing by creating turbulent flow (bolus flow), and provide operators with a quick and easy check of the flow characteristics of the liquid. Samples and standards are treated in an exactly identical manner as they travel the length of the fluidic pathway, eliminating the necessity of a steady state signal, however, since the presence of bubbles create an almost square wave profile, bringing the system to steady state does not significantly decrease throughput ( third generation CFA analyzers average 90 or more samples per hour) and is desirable in that steady state signals (chemical equilibrium) are more accurate and reproducible. Reaching steady state enables lowest detection limits to be reached.

A continuous segmented flow analyzer (SFA) consists of different modules including a sampler, pump, mixing coils, optional sample treatments (dialysis, distillation, heating, etc.), a detector, and data generator. Most continuous flow analyzers depend on color reactions using a flow through photometer, however, also methods have been developed that use ISE, flame photometry, ICAP, fluorometry, and so forth.

=== Flow injection analyzer ===
Flow injection analysis (FIA), was introduced in 1975 by Ruzicka and Hansen, The first generation of FIA technology, termed flow injection (FI), was inspired by the AutoAnalyzer technique invented by Skeggs in early 1950s. While Skeggs' AutoAnalyzer uses air segmentation to separate a flowing stream into numerous discrete segments to establish a long train of individual samples moving through a flow channel, FIA systems separate each sample from subsequent sample with a carrier reagent. While the AutoAnalyzer mixes sample homogeneously with reagents, in all FIA techniques sample and reagents are merged to form a concentration gradient that yields analysis results.

FIA methods can be used for both fast reactions as well as slow reactions. For slow reactions, a heater is often utilized. The reaction does not need to reach completion since all samples and standards are given the same period to react. For typical assays commonly measured with FIA (e.g., nitrite, nitrate, ammonia, phosphate) it is not uncommon to have a throughput of 60-120 samples per hour.

FIA methods are limited by the amount of time necessary to obtain a measurable signal since travel time through the tubing tends to broaden peaks to the point where samples can merge with each other. As a general rule, FIA methods should not be used if an adequate signal cannot be obtained within two minutes, and preferably less than one. Reactions that need longer reaction times should be segmented. However, considering the number of FIA publications and wide variety of uses of FIA for serial assays, the "one minute" time limitation does not seem to be a serious limitation for most real life assays. Yet, assays based on slow chemical reactions have to be carried either in stopped flow mode ( SIA) or by segmenting the flow.

OI Analytical, in its gas diffusion amperometric total cyanide method, uses a segmented flow injection analysis technique that allows reaction times of up to 10 minutes by flow injection analysis.

Technicon experimented with FIA long before it was championed by Ruzicka and Hansen. Andres Ferrari reported that analysis was possible without bubbles if flow rates were increased and tubing diameters decreased. In fact, Skegg's first attempts at the auto analyzer did not segment. Technicon chose to not pursue FIA because it increased reagent consumption and the cost of analysis.

The second generation of the FIA technique, called sequential injection analysis (SIA), was conceived in 1990 by Ruzicka and Marshal, and has been further developed and miniaturized over the course of the following decade. It uses flow programming instead of the continuous flow regime (as used by CFA and FIA), that allows the flow rate and flow direction to be tailored to the need of individual steps of analytical protocol. Reactants are mixed by flow reversals and a measurement is carried out while the reaction mixture is arrested within the detector by stopping the flow. Microminiaturized chromatography is carried out on microcolumns that are automatically renewed by microfluidic manipulations. The discrete pumping and metering of microliter sample and reagent volumes used in SI only generates waste per each sample injection. The enormous volume of FI and SI literature documents the versatility of FI and SI and their usefulness for routine assays (in soil, water, environmental, biochemical and biotechnological assays) has demonstrated their potential to be used as a versatile research tool.

=== Dialyzer module ===
In medical testing applications and industrial samples with high concentrations or interfering material, there is often a dialyzer module in the instrument in which the analyte permeates through a dialysis membrane into a separate flow path going on to further analysis. The purpose of a dialyzer is to separate the analyte from interfering substances such as protein, whose large molecules do not go through the dialysis membrane but go to a separate waste stream. The reagents, sample and reagent volumes, flow rates, and other aspects of the instrument analysis depend on which analyte is being measured. The autoanalyzer is also a very small machine

=== Recording of results ===
Previously a chart recorder and more recently a data logger or personal computer records the detector output as a function of time so that each sample output appears as a peak whose height depends on the analyte level in the sample.

== Commercialization ==
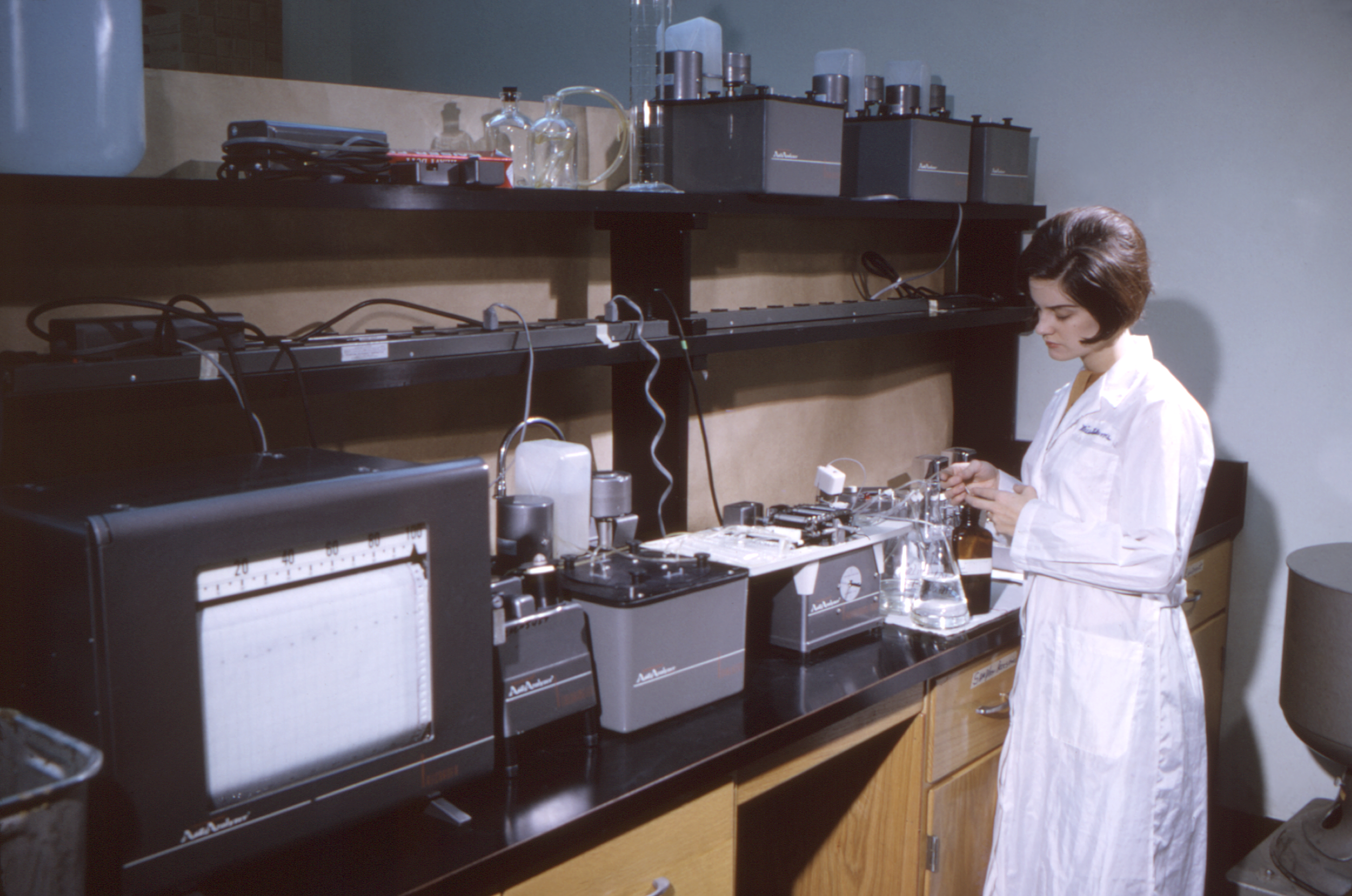
The AutoAnalyzer setup (1966)

Technicon sold its business to Revlon in 1980 who later sold the company to separate clinical (Bayer) and industrial (Bran+Luebbe - now SEAL Analytical) buyers in 1987. At the time, industrial applications accounted for about 20% of CFA machines sold.

In 1974 Ruzicka and Hansen carried out in Denmark and in Brazil initial experiments on a competitive technique, that they termed flow injection analysis (FIA). Since then the technique found worldwide use in research and routine applications, and was further modified through miniaturization and by replacing continuous flow with computer controlled programmable flow.

During the 1960s industrial laboratories were hesitant to use the autoanalyzer. Acceptance by regulatory agencies eventually came about by demonstration that the techniques are no different from a recording spectrophotometer with reagents and samples added at the exact chemical ratios as traditionally accepted manual methods.

The best known of Technicon's CFA instruments are the AutoAnalyzer II (introduced 1970), the Sequential Multiple Analyzer (SMA, 1969), and the Sequential Multiple Analyzer with Computer (SMAC, 1974). The Autoanalyzer II (AAII) is the instrument that most EPA methods were written on and reference. The AAII is a second generation segmented flow analyzer that uses 2 millimeter ID glass tubing and pumps reagent at flow rates of 2 - 3 milliliters per minute. Typical sample throughput for the AAII is 30 - 60 samples per hour. Third generation segmented flow analyzers were proposed in the literature, but not developed commercially until Alpkem introduced the RFA 300 in 1984. The RFA 300 pumps at flow rates less than 1 milliliter per minute through 1 millimeter ID glass mixing coils. Throughput on the RFA can approach 360 samples per hour, but averages closer to 90 samples per hour on most environmental tests. In 1986, Technicon (Bran+Luebbe) introduced its own microflow TRAACS-800 system.

Bran+Luebbe continued to manufacture the AutoAnalyzer II and TRAACS, a micro-flow analyzer for environmental and other samples, introduced the AutoAnalyzer 3 in 1997 and the QuAAtro in 2004. The Bran+Luebbe CFA business was bought by SEAL Analytical in 2006 and they continue to manufacture, sell and support the AutoAnalyzer II/3 and QuAAtro CFA systems, as well as Discrete Analyzers.

And there are other manufacturers of CFA instruments.

Skalar Inc., subsidiary of Skalar Analytical, founded in 1965, which has its head office in Breda (NL), is since its founding an independent company, fully owned by its personnel. Development in robotic analyzers, TOC and TN equipment, and monitors has extended the product lines of its long life SAN++ Continuous Flow Analyzers. Software packages for data acquisition and analyzer control are also in house products, running with latest software demands and handles all analyzer hardware combinations.

Astoria-Pacific International, for example, was founded in 1990 by Raymond Pavitt, who previously owned Alpkem. Based in Clackamas, Oregon, U.S.A., Astoria-Pacific manufactures its own micro-flow systems. Its products include the Astoria Analyzer lines for Environmental and Industrial applications; the SPOTCHECK Analyzer for Neonatal screening; and FASPac (Flow Analysis Software Package) for data acquisition and computer interface.

FIAlab Instruments, Inc., in Seattle, Washington, also manufactures several analyzer systems.

Alpkem was purchased by Perstorp Group, and then later by OI Analytical in College Station Texas. OI Analytical manufactures the only segmented flow analyzer that uses polymeric tubing in place of glass mixing coils. OI is also the only major instrument manufacturer that provides segmented flow analysis (SFA) and flow injection analysis (FIA) options on the same platform.

== Clinical analysis ==
AutoAnalyzers were used mainly for routine repetitive medical laboratory analyses, but they had been replaced during the last years more and more by discrete working systems which allow lower reagent consumption. These instruments typically determine levels of albumin, alkaline phosphatase, aspartate transaminase (AST), blood urea nitrogen, bilirubin, calcium, cholesterol, creatinine, glucose, inorganic phosphorus, proteins, and uric acid in blood serum or other bodily samples. AutoAnalyzers automate repetitive sample analysis steps which would otherwise be done manually by a technician, for such medical tests as the ones mentioned previously. This way, an AutoAnalyzer can analyze hundreds of samples every day with one operating technician. Early AutoAnalyzer instruments each tested multiple samples sequentially for individual analytes. Later model AutoAnalyzers such as the SMAC tested for multiple analytes simultaneously in the samples.

In 1959 a competitive system of analysis was introduced by Hans Baruch of Research Specialties Company. That system became known as Discrete Sample Analysis and was represented by an instrument known as the "Robot Chemist." Over the years the Discrete Sample Analysis method slowly replaced the Continuous Flow system in the clinical laboratory.

== Industrial analysis ==
The first industrial applications - mainly for water, soil extracts and fertilizer - used the same hardware and techniques as clinical methods, but from the mid-1970s special techniques and modules were developed so that by 1990 it was possible to perform solvent extraction, distillation, on-line filtration and UV digestion in the continuously flowing stream. In 2005 about two thirds of systems sold worldwide were for water analysis of all kinds, ranging from sub-ppb levels of nutrients in seawater to much higher levels in waste water; other common applications are for soil, plant, tobacco, food, fertilizer and wine analysis.

== Current Uses ==
AutoAnalyzers are still used for a few clinical applications such as neonatal screening or Anti-D, but the majority of instruments are now used for industrial and environmental work. Standardized methods have been published by the ASTM (ASTM International), the US Environmental Protection Agency (EPA) as well as the International Organization for Standardization (ISO) for environmental analytes such as nitrite, nitrate, ammonia, cyanide, and phenol. Autoanalyzers are also commonly used in soil testing laboratories, fertilizer analysis, process control, seawater analysis, air contaminants, and tobacco leaf analysis.

== Method sheets ==
Technicon published method sheets for a wide range of analyses and a few of these are listed below. These methods and later methods are available from SEAL Analytical. Method lists for manufacturers instruments are readily available on their websites.

Sheet no.	Determination	Sample	Main reagent(s)	Colorimeter
N-1c	Urea nitrogen	Serum or urine	Diacetyl monoxime	520 nm
N-2b	Glucose	Serum	Potassium ferricyanide	420 nm
N-3b	Kjeldahl nitrogen	Foodstuffs	Phenol & hypochlorite	630 nm
P-3b	Phosphate	Boiler water	Molybdate	650 nm
