= Analytical quality control =

Ensuring accuracy of analytical measurements

Analytical quality control (AQC) refers to all those processes and procedures designed to ensure that the results of laboratory analysis are consistent, comparable, accurate and within specified limits of precision. Constituents submitted to the analytical laboratory must be accurately described to avoid faulty interpretations, approximations, or incorrect results. The qualitative and quantitative data generated from the laboratory can then be used for decision making. In the chemical sense, quantitative analysis refers to the measurement of the amount or concentration of an element or chemical compound in a matrix that differs from the element or compound. Fields such as industry, medicine, and law enforcement can make use of AQC.

== In the laboratory ==
AQC processes are of particular importance in laboratories analysing environmental samples where the concentration of chemical species present may be extremely low and close to the detection limit of the analytical method. In well managed laboratories, AQC processes are built into the routine operations of the laboratory often by the random introduction of known standards into the sample stream or by the use of spiked samples.

Quality control begins with sample collection and ends with the reporting of data. AQC is achieved through laboratory control of analytical performance. Initial control of the complete system can be achieved through specification of laboratory services, instrumentation, glassware, reagents, solvents, and gases. However, evaluation of daily performance must be documented to ensure continual production of valid data. A check should first be done to ensure that the data should be seen is precise and accurate. Next, systematic daily checks such as analysing blanks, calibration standards, quality control check samples, and references must be performed to establish the reproducibility of the data. The checks help certify that the methodology is measuring what is in the sample.

The quality of individual AQC efforts can be variable depending on the training, professional pride, and importance of a particular project to a particular analyst. The burden of an individual analyst originating AQC efforts can be lessened through the implementation of quality assurance programs. Through the implementation of established and routine quality assurance programs, two primary functions are fulfilled: the determination of quality, and the control of quality. By monitoring the accuracy and precision of results, the quality assurance program should increase confidence in the reliability of the reported analytical results, thereby achieving adequate AQC.

== Pharmaceutical industry ==
Validation of analytical procedures is imperative in demonstrating that a drug substance is suitable for a particular purpose. Common validation characteristics include: accuracy, precision (repeatability and intermediate precision), specificity, detection limit, quantitation limit, linearity, range, and robustness. In cases such as changes in synthesis of the drug substance, changes in composition of the finished product, and changes in the analytical procedure, revalidation is necessary to ensure quality control.

All analytical procedures should be validated. Identification tests are conducted to ensure the identity of an analyte in a sample through comparison of the sample to a reference standard through methods such as spectrum, chromatographic behavior, and chemical reactivity. Impurity testing can either be a quantitative test or a limit test. Both tests should accurately measure the purity of the sample. Quantitative tests of either the active moiety or other components of a sample can be conducted through assay procedures. Other analytical procedures such as dissolution testing or particle size determination may also need to be validated and are equally important.

== Statistics ==
Because of the complex inter-relationship between analytical method, sample concentration, limits of detection and method precision, the management of Analytical Quality Control is undertaken using a statistical approach to determine whether the results obtained lie within an acceptable statistical envelope.

== Inter-laboratory calibration ==
In circumstances where more than one laboratory is analysing samples and feeding data into a large programme of work such as the Harmonised monitoring scheme in the UK, AQC can also be applied to validate one laboratory against another. In such cases the work may be referred to as inter-laboratory calibration.
