= SPECTRO Analytical Instruments =

SPECTRO Analytical Instruments is a German manufacturer of analytical instruments specializing in optical emission and X‑ray fluorescence spectrometry. The company is headquartered in Kleve, Germany, and since 2005 has operated as part of the Materials Analysis Division of the U.S. firm AMETEK, Inc. SPECTRO’s products are used for elemental analysis in applications including metal production and recycling, environmental and petrochemical testing, and industrial quality control. The product range includes arc/spark optical emission spectrometers for metals, inductively coupled plasma optical emission spectrometers (ICP-OES) for liquids, energy-dispersive X-ray fluorescence (ED-XRF) spectrometers for solids and liquids, and, as of 2025, an inductively coupled plasma mass spectrometer (ICP-MS) instrument.

== History ==
SPECTRO Analytical Instruments was founded in 1979 in Kleve, West Germany. The company initially focused on arc/spark optical emission spectrometers for metal alloy analysis. In the 1980s and 1990s, SPECTRO expanded its portfolio to include ICP-OES for trace element analysis in liquid samples and ED-XRF analyzers for various materials. By the early 2000s, the company had installed over 20,000 spectrometers worldwide.

In June 2005, SPECTRO was acquired by AMETEK, Inc. Following the acquisition, SPECTRO became part of AMETEK’s Materials Analysis Division. The company continued to grow under AMETEK ownership: it shipped its 30,000th instrument in 2008 and its 40,000th instrument by 2015.

In July 2025, SPECTRO introduced the ICP-MS instrument, the SPECTROGREEN MS quadrupole mass spectrometer, marking the company’s entry into quadrupole mass spectrometry for ultra-trace elemental analysis.

== Products ==
Arc/Spark Optical Emission Spectrometers (OES): SPECTRO produces stationary and mobile arc/spark OES systems used for rapid elemental analysis of metals (for example, in foundries and scrap sorting). These instruments excite a metal sample with an electrical discharge and measure the light spectrum to determine the alloy composition.

ICP-OES Spectrometers: The company’s inductively coupled plasma optical emission spectrometers (such as the SPECTRO ARCOS and SPECTROGREEN models) are used for analyzing trace metals in liquids (e.g. water, wastewater, chemical solutions). SPECTRO introduced a patented Dual Side-On Interface (DSOI) for its ICP-OES line, which observes the plasma from two sides to increase sensitivity for low-concentration elements. The ICP-OES instruments are commonly used in environmental laboratories and industrial laboratories for multi-element analysis.

ED-XRF Spectrometers: SPECTRO’s energy-dispersive X-ray fluorescence analyzers include bench-top systems (like the SPECTRO XEPOS) and handheld devices (such as the SPECTRO xSORT). These XRF spectrometers provide non-destructive elemental analysis of solid and liquid samples and are used in applications ranging from precious metal testing and RoHS compliance screening to geological exploration.

ICP-MS Spectrometer: In 2025, SPECTRO added an inductively coupled plasma mass spectrometer to its product lineup with the launch of the SPECTROGREEN MS ICP-MS. This quadrupole ICP-MS is designed for ultra-trace detection of elements and complements the company’s ICP-OES line by offering lower detection limits (for example, in drinking water analysis or food safety testing). It features automated sample handling and interference removal techniques aimed at routine laboratory use.

See also

- Optical emission spectrometry – technique used in arc/spark OES and ICP-OES instruments
- X-ray fluorescence – analytical technique used in XRF spectrometers
- Inductively coupled plasma mass spectrometry – analytical technique introduced to SPECTRO’s portfolio in 2025
