= Inductively coupled plasma mass spectrometry =

Type of mass spectrometry that uses an inductively coupled plasma to ionize the sample

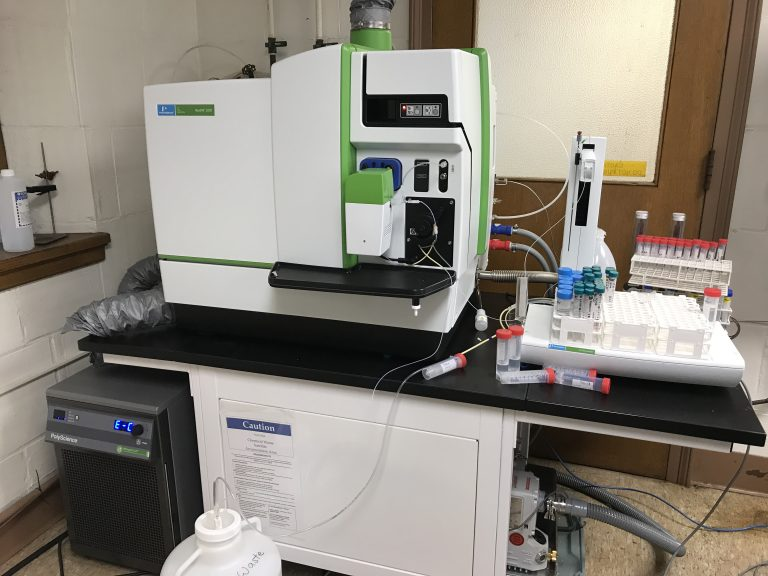
- Perkin Elmer NexION 2000 ICP-MS
- Acronym: ICP-MS
- Classification: Mass spectrometry
- Analytes: atomic and polyatomic species in plasma, with exceptions; usually interpreted towards concentrations of chemical elements in sample
- Manufacturers: Skyray, Agilent, Analytik Jena, Horiba (only ICP-OES), PerkinElmer, Shimadzu, Spectro, Thermo, GBC Scientific, Nu Instruments, DVS Sciences (now Standard BioTools)

Other techniques
- Related: Inductively coupled plasma atomic emission spectroscopy
- Hyphenated: Liquid chromatography-inductively coupled plasma mass spectrometry (LC-ICP-MS), Gas chromatography-inductively coupled plasma mass spectrometry (GC-ICP-MS), Laser ablation inductively coupled mass spectrometry (LA-ICP-MS)

Inductively coupled plasma mass spectrometry (ICP-MS) is a type of mass spectrometry that uses an inductively coupled plasma to ionize the sample. It atomizes the sample and creates atomic and small polyatomic ions, which are then detected. It is known and used for its ability to detect metals and several non-metals in liquid samples at very low concentrations. It can detect different isotopes of the same element, which makes it a versatile tool in isotopic labeling.

Compared to atomic absorption spectroscopy, ICP-MS has greater speed, precision, and sensitivity. However, compared with other types of mass spectrometry, such as thermal ionization mass spectrometry (TIMS) and glow discharge mass spectrometry (GD-MS), ICP-MS introduces many interfering species: argon from the plasma, component gases of air that leak through the cone orifices, and contamination from glassware and the cones.

== Components ==
=== Inductively coupled plasma ===
An inductively coupled plasma is a plasma that is energized (ionized) by inductively heating the gas with an electromagnetic coil, and contains a sufficient concentration of ions and electrons to make the gas electrically conductive. Not all of the gas needs to be ionized for the gas to have the characteristics of a plasma; as little as 1% ionization creates a plasma. The plasmas used in spectrochemical analysis are essentially electrically neutral, with each positive charge on an ion balanced by a free electron. In these plasmas the positive ions are almost all singly charged and there are few negative ions, so there are nearly equal numbers of ions and electrons in each unit volume of plasma.

The ICPs have two operation modes, called capacitive (E) mode with low plasma density and inductive (H) mode with high plasma density, and E to H heating mode transition occurs with external inputs. The Inductively Coupled Plasma Mass Spectrometry is operated in the H mode.

What makes Inductively Coupled Plasma Mass Spectrometry (ICP-MS) unique to other forms of inorganic mass spectrometry is its ability to sample the analyte continuously, without interruption. This is in contrast to other forms of inorganic mass spectrometry; Glow Discharge Mass Spectrometry (GDMS) and Thermal Ionization Mass Spectrometry (TIMS), that require a two-stage process: Insert sample(s) into a vacuum chamber, seal the vacuum chamber, pump down the vacuum, energize sample, thereby sending ions into the mass analyzer. With ICP-MS the sample to be analyzed is sitting at atmospheric pressure. Through the effective use of differential pumping; multiple vacuum stages separate by differential apertures (holes), the ions created in the argon plasma are, with the aid of various electrostatic focusing techniques, transmitted through the mass analyzer to the detector(s) and counted. Not only does this enable the analyst to radically increase sample throughput (amount of samples over time), but has also made it possible to do what is called "time resolved acquisition". Hyphenated techniques like Liquid Chromatography ICP-MS (LC-ICP-MS); Laser Ablation ICP-MS (LA-ICP-MS); Flow Injection ICP-MS (FIA-ICP-MS), etc. have benefited from this relatively new technology. It has stimulated the development of new tools for research including geochemistry and forensic chemistry; biochemistry and oceanography. Additionally, increases in sample throughput from dozens of samples a day to hundreds of samples a day have revolutionized environmental analysis, reducing costs. Fundamentally, this is all due to the fact that while the sample resides at environmental pressure, the analyzer and detector are at 1/10,000,000 of that same pressure during normal operation.

An inductively coupled plasma (ICP) for spectrometry is sustained in a torch that consists of three concentric tubes, usually made of quartz, although the inner tube (injector) can be sapphire if hydrofluoric acid is being used. The end of this torch is placed inside an induction coil supplied with a radio-frequency electric current. A flow of argon gas (usually 13 to 18 liters per minute) is introduced between the two outermost tubes of the torch and an electric spark is applied for a short time to introduce free electrons into the gas stream. These electrons interact with the radio-frequency magnetic field of the induction coil and are accelerated first in one direction, then the other, as the field changes at high frequency (usually 27.12 million cycles per second). The accelerated electrons collide with argon atoms, and sometimes a collision causes an argon atom to part with one of its electrons. The released electron is in turn accelerated by the rapidly changing magnetic field. The process continues until the rate of release of new electrons in collisions is balanced by the rate of recombination of electrons with argon ions (atoms that have lost an electron). This produces a ‘fireball’ that consists mostly of argon atoms with a rather small fraction of free electrons and argon ions. The temperature of the plasma is very high, of the order of 10,000 K. The plasma also produces ultraviolet light, so for safety should not be viewed directly.

The ICP can be retained in the quartz torch because the flow of gas between the two outermost tubes keeps the plasma away from the walls of the torch. A second flow of argon (around 1 liter per minute) is usually introduced between the central tube and the intermediate tube to keep the plasma away from the end of the central tube. A third flow (again usually around 1 liter per minute) of gas is introduced into the central tube of the torch. This gas flow passes through the centre of the plasma, where it forms a channel that is cooler than the surrounding plasma but still much hotter than a chemical flame. Samples to be analyzed are introduced into this central channel, usually as a mist of liquid formed by passing the liquid sample into a nebulizer.

To maximise plasma temperature (and hence ionisation efficiency) and stability, the sample should be introduced through the central tube with as little liquid (solvent load) as possible, and with consistent droplet sizes. A nebuliser can be used for liquid samples, followed by a spray chamber to remove larger droplets, or a desolvating nebuliser can be used to evaporate most of the solvent before it reaches the torch. Solid samples can also be introduced using laser ablation. The sample enters the central channel of the ICP, evaporates, molecules break apart, and then the constituent atoms ionise. At the temperatures prevailing in the plasma a significant proportion of the atoms of many chemical elements are ionized, each atom losing its most loosely bound electron to form a singly charged ion. The plasma temperature is selected to maximise ionisation efficiency for elements with a high first ionisation energy, while minimising second ionisation (double charging) for elements that have a low second ionisation energy.

=== Mass spectrometry ===
For coupling to mass spectrometry, the ions from the plasma are extracted through a series of cones into a mass spectrometer, usually a quadrupole. The ions are separated on the basis of their mass-to-charge ratio and a detector receives an ion signal proportional to the concentration.

The concentration of a sample can be determined through calibration with certified reference material such as single or multi-element reference standards. ICP-MS also lends itself to quantitative determinations through isotope dilution, a single point method based on an isotopically enriched standard. In order to increase reproducibility and compensate for errors by sensitivity variation, an internal standard can be added.

Other mass analyzers coupled to ICP systems include double focusing magnetic-electrostatic sector systems with both single and multiple collector, as well as time of flight systems (both axial and orthogonal accelerators have been used).

== Applications ==
One of the largest volume uses for ICP-MS is in the medical and forensic field, specifically, toxicology. A physician may order a metal assay for a number of reasons, such as suspicion of heavy metal poisoning, metabolic concerns, and even hepatological issues. Depending on the specific parameters unique to each patient's diagnostic plan, samples collected for analysis can range from whole blood, urine, plasma, serum, to even packed red blood cells. Another primary use for this instrument lies in the environmental field. Such applications include water testing for municipalities or private individuals all the way to soil, water and other material analysis for industrial purposes.

In recent years, industrial and biological monitoring has presented another major need for metal analysis via ICP-MS. Individuals working in factories where exposure to metals is likely and unavoidable, such as a battery factory, are required by their employer to have their blood or urine analyzed for metal toxicity on a regular basis. This monitoring has become a mandatory practice implemented by the U.S. Occupational Safety and Health Administration, in an effort to protect workers from their work environment and ensure proper rotation of work duties (i.e. rotating employees from a high exposure position to a low exposure position).

ICP-MS is also used widely in the geochemistry field for radiometric dating, in which it is used to analyze relative abundance of different isotopes, in particular uranium and lead. ICP-MS is more suitable for this application than the previously used thermal ionization mass spectrometry, as species with high ionization energy such as osmium and tungsten can be easily ionized. For high precision ratio work, multiple collector instruments are normally used to reduce the effect noise on the calculated ratios.

In the field of flow cytometry, a new technique uses ICP-MS to replace the traditional fluorochromes. Briefly, instead of labelling antibodies (or other biological probes) with fluorochromes, each antibody is labelled with a distinct combinations of lanthanides. When the sample of interest is analysed by ICP-MS in a specialised flow cytometer, each antibody can be identified and quantitated by virtue of a distinct ICP "footprint". In theory, hundreds of different biological probes can thus be analysed in an individual cell, at a rate of ca. 1,000 cells per second. Because elements are easily distinguished in ICP-MS, the problem of compensation in multiplex flow cytometry is effectively eliminated.

Laser ablation inductively coupled plasma mass spectrometry (LA-ICP-MS) is a powerful technique for the elemental analysis of a wide variety of materials encountered in forensic casework. (LA-ICP-MS) has already successfully been applied to applications in forensics, metals, glasses, soils, car paints, bones and teeth, printing inks, trace elemental, fingerprint, and paper. Among these, forensic glass analysis stands out as an application for which this technique has great utility to provide highly. Car hit and runs, burglaries, assaults, drive-by shootings and bombings such as these situations may cause glass fragments that could be used as evidence of association in glass transfer conditions. LA-ICP-MS is considered one of the best techniques for analysis of glass due to the short time for sample preparation and sample, small sample size of less than 250 nanograms. In addition there is no need for complex procedure and handling of dangerous materials that is used for digestion of the samples. This allows detecting major, minor and tracing elements with high level of precision and accuracy. There are set of properties that are used to measure glass sample such as physical and optical properties including color, thickness, density, refractive index (RI) and also, if necessary, elemental analysis can be conducted in order to enhance the value of an association.

=== Pharmaceutical industry ===
In the pharmaceutical industry, ICP-MS is used for detecting inorganic impurities in pharmaceuticals and their ingredients. New and reduced maximum permitted exposure levels of heavy metals from dietary supplements, introduced in USP (United States Pharmacopeia) «〈232〉Elemental Impurities—Limits» and USP «〈233〉Elemental Impurities—Procedures», will increase the need for ICP-MS technology, where, previously, other analytic methods have been sufficient. Cosmetics, such as lipstick, recovered from a crime scene may provide valuable forensic information. Lipstick smears left on cigarette butts, glassware, clothing, bedding; napkins, paper, etc. may be valuable evidence. Lipstick recovered from clothing or skin may also indicate physical contact between individuals. Forensic analysis of recovered lipstick smear evidence can provide valuable information on the recent activities of a victim or suspect. Trace elemental analysis of lipstick smears could be used to complement existing visual comparative procedures to determine the lipstick brand and color.

Single Particle Inductively Coupled Plasma Mass Spectroscopy (SP ICP-MS) was designed for particle suspensions in 2000 by Claude Degueldre. He first tested this new methodology at the Forel Institute of the University of Geneva and presented this new analytical approach at the 'Colloid 2oo2' symposium during the spring 2002 meeting of the EMRS, and in the proceedings in 2003. This study presents the theory of SP ICP-MS and the results of tests carried out on clay particles (montmorillonite) as well as other suspensions of colloids. This method was then tested on thorium dioxide nanoparticles by Degueldre & Favarger (2004), zirconium dioxide by Degueldre et al (2004) and gold nanoparticles, which are used as a substrate in nanopharmacy, and published by Degueldre et al (2006). Subsequently, the study of uranium dioxide nano- and micro-particles gave rise to a detailed publication, Ref. Degueldre et al (2006). Since 2010 the interest for SP ICP-MS has exploded.

Previous forensic techniques employed for the organic analysis of lipsticks by compositional comparison include thin layer chromatography (TLC), gas chromatography (GC), and high-performance liquid chromatography (HPLC). These methods provide useful information regarding the identification of lipsticks. However, they all require long sample preparation times and destroy the sample. Nondestructive techniques for the forensic analysis of lipstick smears include UV fluorescence observation combined with purge-and-trap gas chromatography, microspectrophotometry and scanning electron microscopy-energy dispersive spectroscopy (SEM-EDS), and Raman spectroscopy.

=== Metal speciation ===
A growing trend in the world of elemental analysis has revolved around the speciation, or determination of oxidation state of certain metals such as chromium and arsenic. The toxicity of those elements varies with the oxidation state, so new regulations from food authorities requires speciation of some elements. One of the primary techniques to achieve this is to separate the chemical species with high-performance liquid chromatography (HPLC) or field flow fractionation (FFF) and then measure the concentrations with ICP-MS.

=== Quantification of proteins and biomolecules ===
There is an increasing trend of using ICP-MS as a tool in speciation analysis, which normally involves a front end chromatograph separation and an elemental selective detector, such as AAS and ICP-MS. For example, ICP-MS can be combined with size exclusion chromatography and preparative native PAGE for identifying and quantifying metalloproteins in biofluids. Also the phosphorylation status of proteins can be analyzed.

In 2007, a new type of protein tagging reagents called metal-coded affinity tags (MeCAT) were introduced to label proteins quantitatively with metals, especially lanthanides. The MeCAT labelling allows relative and absolute quantification of all kind of proteins or other biomolecules like peptides. MeCAT comprises a site-specific biomolecule tagging group with at least a strong chelate group which binds metals. The MeCAT labelled proteins can be accurately quantified by ICP-MS down to low attomol amount of analyte which is at least 2–3 orders of magnitude more sensitive than other mass spectrometry based quantification methods. By introducing several MeCAT labels to a biomolecule and further optimization of LC-ICP-MS detection limits in the zeptomol range are within the realm of possibility. By using different lanthanides MeCAT multiplexing can be used for pharmacokinetics of proteins and peptides or the analysis of the differential expression of proteins (proteomics) e.g. in biological fluids. Breakable PAGE SDS-PAGE (DPAGE, dissolvable PAGE), two-dimensional gel electrophoresis or chromatography is used for separation of MeCAT labelled proteins. Flow-injection ICP-MS analysis of protein bands or spots from DPAGE SDS-PAGE gels can be easily performed by dissolving the DPAGE gel after electrophoresis and staining of the gel. MeCAT labelled proteins are identified and relatively quantified on peptide level by MALDI-MS or ESI-MS.

=== Elemental analysis ===
The ICP-MS allows determination of elements with atomic mass ranges 7 to 250 (Li to U), and sometimes higher. Some masses are prohibited, such as 40 Da, due to the abundance of argon in the sample. Other interference regions may include mass 80 (due to the argon dimer) and mass 56 (due to ArO), the latter of which greatly hinders Fe detection unless the instrument is fitted with a reaction chamber. Such interferences can be reduced by using a high resolution ICP-MS (HR-ICP-MS) which uses two or more slits to constrict the beam and distinguish between nearby peaks. This comes at the cost of sensitivity. For example, distinguishing iron from argon requires a resolving power of about 10,000, which may reduce the iron sensitivity by around 99%. Interfering species can alternatively be distinguished through the use of a collision chamber, which can filter gasses by either chemical reaction or physical collision.

A single collector ICP-MS may use a multiplier in pulse counting mode to amplify very low signals, an attenuation grid or a multiplier in analogue mode to detect medium signals, and a Faraday cup/bucket to detect larger signals. A multi-collector ICP-MS may have more than one of any of these, typically Faraday buckets which are more cost-effective than other collectors. With this combination, a dynamic range of 12 orders of magnitude, from 1 part per quadrillion (ppq) to 100 parts per million (ppm) is possible.

ICP-MS is a common method for the determination of cadmium in biological samples.

Unlike atomic absorption spectroscopy, which can only measure a single element at a time, ICP-MS has the capability to scan for all elements simultaneously. This allows rapid sample processing. A simultaneous ICP-MS that can record the entire analytical spectrum from lithium to uranium in every analysis won the Silver Award at the 2010 Pittcon Editors' Awards. An ICP-MS may use multiple scan modes, each one striking a different balance between speed and precision. Using the magnet alone to scan is slow due to hysteresis but is precise. Electrostatic plates can be used in addition to the magnet to increase the speed, and with multiple collectors can allow a scan of every element from Lithium 6 to Uranium Oxide 256 in less than a quarter of a second. For low detection limits, interfering species and high precision, the counting time can increase substantially. The rapid scanning, large dynamic range and large mass range of ICP-MS is ideally suited to measuring multiple unknown concentrations and isotope ratios in samples that have had minimal preparation (an advantage over TIMS). The analysis of seawater, urine, and digested whole rock samples are examples of industry applications. These properties also lend well to laser-ablated rock samples, where the scanning rate is fast enough to enable a real-time plot of any number of isotopes. This also allows easy spatial mapping of mineral grains.

=== Single particles ===
Single particle inductively coupled plasma mass spectrometry (SP-ICP-MS) was designed for particle suspensions in 2000 by Claude Degueldre. He first tested this new methodology at the Forel Institute of the University of Geneva and presented this approach at the 'Colloid 2oo2' symposium during the spring 2002 meeting of the EMRS, and in the proceedings in 2003. This study presents the theory of SP ICP-MS and the results of tests carried out on clay particles (montmorillonite) as well as other suspensions of colloids. This method was then tested on thorium dioxide nanoparticles, zirconium dioxide and gold nanoparticles and uranium dioxide nano- and micro-particles.

== Hardware ==
In terms of input and output, ICP-MS instrument consumes prepared sample material and translates it into mass-spectral data. Actual analytical procedure takes some time; after that time the instrument can be switched to work on the next sample. Series of such sample measurements requires the instrument to have plasma ignited, meanwhile a number of technical parameters has to be stable in order for the results obtained to have feasibly accurate and precise interpretation. Maintaining the plasma requires a constant supply of carrier gas (usually, pure argon) and increased power consumption of the instrument. When these additional running costs are not considered justified, plasma and most of auxiliary systems can be turned off. In such standby mode only pumps are working to keep proper vacuum in mass-spectrometer.

The constituents of ICP-MS instrument are designed to allow for reproducible and/or stable operation.

=== Sample introduction ===
The first step in analysis is the introduction of the sample. This has been achieved in ICP-MS through a variety of means.

The most common method is the use of analytical nebulizers. A nebulizer converts liquids into an aerosol, and that aerosol can then be swept into the plasma to create the ions. Nebulizers work best with simple liquid samples (i.e. solutions). However, there have been instances of their use with more complex materials like a slurry. Many varieties of nebulizers have been coupled to ICP-MS, including pneumatic, cross-flow, Babington, ultrasonic, and desolvating types. The aerosol generated is often treated to limit it to only smallest droplets, commonly by means of a Peltier cooled double pass or cyclonic spray chamber. Use of autosamplers makes this easier and faster, especially for routine work and large numbers of samples. A Desolvating Nebuliser (DSN) may also be used; this uses a long heated capillary, coated with a fluoropolymer membrane, to remove most of the solvent and reduce the load on the plasma. Matrix removal introduction systems are sometimes used for samples, such as seawater, where the species of interest are at trace levels, and are surrounded by much more abundant contaminants.

Laser ablation is another method. Though less common in the past, it has become popular as a means of sample introduction, thanks to increased ICP-MS scanning speeds. In this method, a pulsed UV laser is focused on the sample and creates a plume of ablated material, which can be swept into the plasma. This allows geochemists to spatially map the isotope composition in cross-sections of rock samples, a tool which is lost if the rock is digested and introduced as a liquid sample. Lasers for this task are built to have highly controllable power outputs and uniform radial power distributions, to produce craters which are flat bottomed and of a chosen diameter and depth.

For both Laser Ablation and Desolvating Nebulisers, a small flow of nitrogen may also be introduced into the argon flow. Nitrogen exists as a dimer, so has more vibrational modes and is more efficient at receiving energy from the RF coil around the torch.

Other methods of sample introduction are also utilized. Electrothermal vaporization (ETV) and in torch vaporization (ITV) use hot surfaces (graphite or metal, generally) to vaporize samples for introduction. These can use very small amounts of liquids, solids, or slurries. Other methods like vapor generation are also known.

=== Plasma torch ===
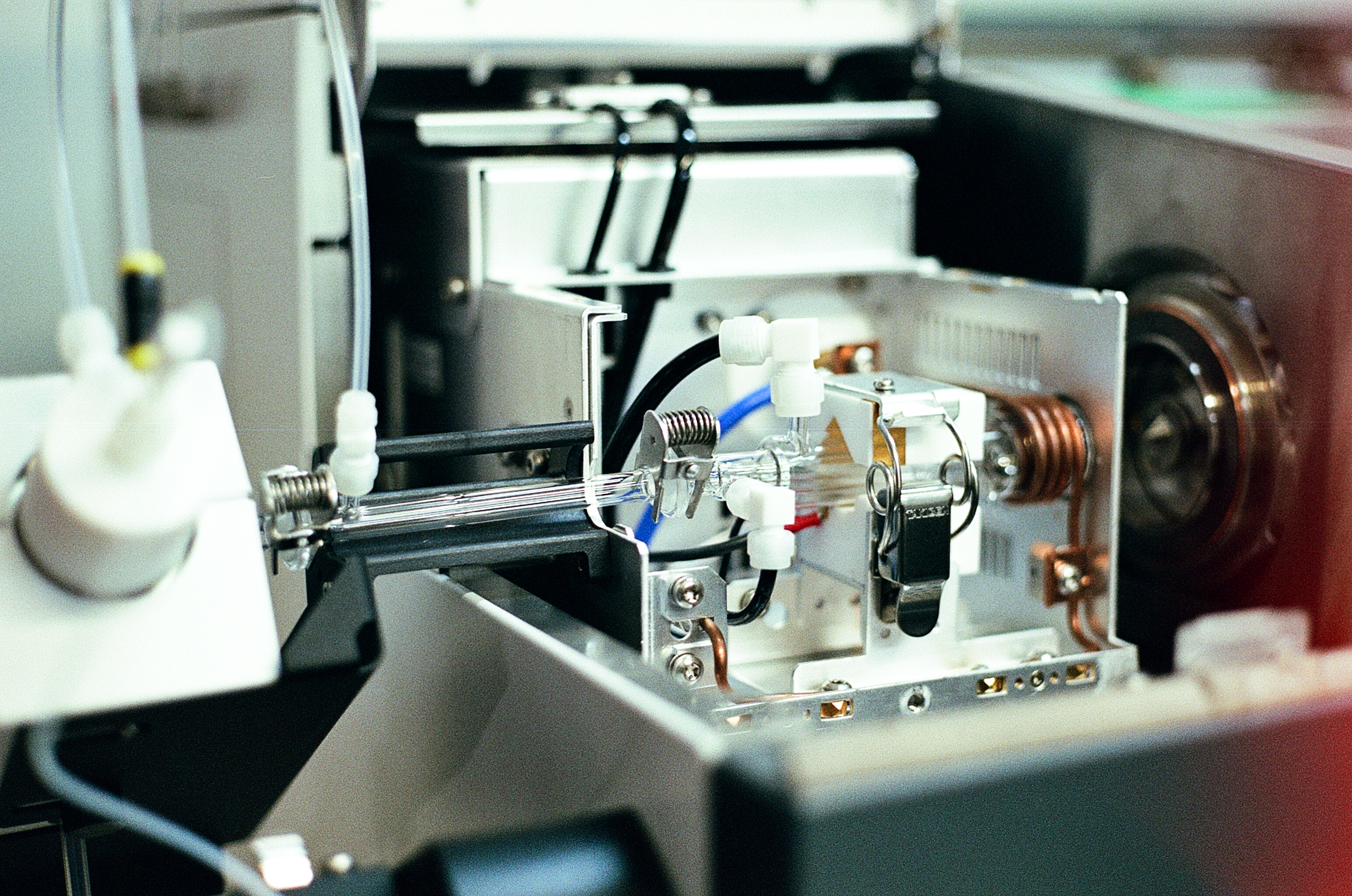
The atomizer of an ICP

The construction of an inductively coupled plasma torch. A: cooling gas tangential flow to the outer quartz tube B: discharge gas flow (usually Ar) C: flow of carrier gas with sample D: induction coil which forms the strong magnetic field inside the torch E: force vectors of the magnetic field F: the plasma torch (the discharge).

The plasma used in an ICP-MS is made by partially ionizing argon gas (Ar → Ar^{+} + e^{−}). The energy required for this reaction is obtained by pulsing an alternating electric current in load coil that surrounds the plasma torch with a flow of argon gas.

After the sample is injected, the plasma's extreme temperature causes the sample to separate into individual atoms (atomization). Next, the plasma ionizes these atoms (M → M^{+} + e^{−}) so that they can be detected by the mass spectrometer.

An inductively coupled plasma (ICP) for spectrometry is sustained in a torch that consists of three concentric tubes, usually made of quartz. The two major designs are the Fassel and Greenfield torches. The end of this torch is placed inside an induction coil supplied with a radio-frequency electric current. A flow of argon gas (usually 14 to 18 liters per minute) is introduced between the two outermost tubes of the torch and an electrical spark is applied for a short time to introduce free electrons into the gas stream. These electrons interact with the radio-frequency magnetic field of the induction coil and are accelerated first in one direction, then the other, as the field changes at high frequency (usually 27.12 MHz or 40 MHz). The accelerated electrons collide with argon atoms, and sometimes a collision causes an argon atom to part with one of its electrons. The released electron is in turn accelerated by the rapidly changing magnetic field. The process continues until the rate of release of new electrons in collisions is balanced by the rate of recombination of electrons with argon ions (atoms that have lost an electron). This produces a ‘fireball’ that consists mostly of argon atoms with a rather small fraction of free electrons and argon ions.

==== Advantage of argon ====
Making the plasma from argon, instead of other gases, has several advantages. First, argon is abundant (in the atmosphere, as a result of the radioactive decay of potassium) and therefore cheaper than other noble gases. Argon also has a higher first ionization potential than all other elements except He, F, and Ne. Because of this high ionization energy, the reaction (Ar^{+} + e^{−} → Ar) is more energetically favorable than the reaction (M^{+} + e^{−} → M). This ensures that the sample remains ionized (as M^{+}) so that the mass spectrometer can detect it.

Argon can be purchased for use with the ICP-MS in either a refrigerated liquid or a gas form. It should have a guaranteed purity of 99.9% Argon at a minimum. It is important to determine which type of argon will be best suited for the specific situation. Liquid argon is typically cheaper and can be stored in a greater quantity as opposed to the gas form, which is more expensive and takes up more tank space. If the instrument is in an environment where it gets infrequent use, then buying argon in the gas state will be most appropriate as it will be more than enough to suit smaller run times and gas in the cylinder will remain stable for longer periods of time, whereas liquid argon will suffer loss to the environment due to venting of the tank when stored over extended time frames. However, if the ICP-MS is to be used routinely and is on and running for eight or more hours each day for several days a week, then going with liquid argon will be the most suitable. If there are to be multiple ICP-MS instruments running for long periods of time, then it will most likely be beneficial for the laboratory to install a bulk or micro bulk argon tank which will be maintained by a gas supply company, thus eliminating the need to change out tanks frequently as well as minimizing loss of argon that is left over in each used tank as well as down time for tank changeover.

Helium can be used either in place of, or mixed with, argon for plasma generation. Helium's higher first ionisation energy allows greater ionisation and therefore higher sensitivity for hard-to-ionise elements. The use of pure helium also avoids argon-based interferences such as ArO. However, many of the interferences can be mitigated by use of a collision cell, and the greater cost of helium has prevented its use in commercial ICP-MS.

=== Transfer of ions into vacuum ===
The carrier gas is sent through the central channel and into the very hot plasma. The sample is then exposed to radio frequency which converts the gas into a plasma. The high temperature of the plasma is sufficient to cause a very large portion of the sample to form ions. This fraction of ionization can approach 100% for some elements (e.g. sodium), but this is dependent on the ionization potential. A fraction of the formed ions passes through a ~1 mm hole (sampler cone) and then a ~0.4 mm hole (skimmer cone). The purpose of which is to allow a vacuum that is required by the mass spectrometer.

The vacuum is created and maintained by a series of pumps. The first stage is usually based on a roughing pump, most commonly a standard rotary vane pump. This removes most of the gas and typically reaches a pressure of around 133 Pa. Later stages have their vacuum generated by more powerful vacuum systems, most often turbomolecular pumps. Older instruments may have used oil diffusion pumps for high vacuum regions.

=== Ion optics ===
Before mass separation, a beam of positive ions has to be extracted from the plasma and focused into the mass-analyzer. It is important to separate the ions from UV photons, energetic neutrals and from any solid particles that may have been carried into the instrument from the ICP. Traditionally, ICP-MS instruments have used transmitting ion lens arrangements for this purpose. Examples include the Einzel lens, the Barrel lens, Agilent's Omega Lens and Perkin-Elmer's Shadow Stop. Another approach is to use ion guides (quadrupoles, hexapoles, or octopoles) to guide the ions into mass analyzer along a path away from the trajectory of photons or neutral particles. Yet another approach is Varian patented used by Analytik Jena ICP-MS 90 degrees reflecting parabolic "Ion Mirror" optics, which are claimed to provide more efficient ion transport into the mass-analyzer, resulting in better sensitivity and reduced background. Analytik Jena ICP-MS PQMS is the most sensitive instrument on the market.

A sector ICP-MS will commonly have four sections: an extraction acceleration region, steering lenses, an electrostatic sector and a magnetic sector. The first region takes ions from the plasma and accelerates them using a high voltage. The second uses may use a combination of parallel plates, rings, quadrupoles, hexapoles and octopoles to steer, shape and focus the beam so that the resulting peaks are symmetrical, flat topped and have high transmission. The electrostatic sector may be before or after the magnetic sector depending on the particular instrument, and reduces the spread in kinetic energy caused by the plasma. This spread is particularly large for ICP-MS, being larger than Glow Discharge and much larger than TIMS. The geometry of the instrument is chosen so that the instrument the combined focal point of the electrostatic and magnetic sectors is at the collector, known as Double Focusing (or Double Focussing).

If the mass of interest has a low sensitivity and is just below a much larger peak, the low mass tail from this larger peak can intrude onto the mass of interest. A Retardation Filter might be used to reduce this tail. This sits near the collector, and applies a voltage equal but opposite to the accelerating voltage; any ions that have lost energy while flying around the instrument will be decelerated to rest by the filter.

=== Collision reaction cell and iCRC ===
The collision/reaction cell is used to remove interfering ions through ion/neutral reactions. Collision/reaction cells are known under several names. The dynamic reaction cell is located before the quadrupole in the ICP-MS device. The chamber has a quadrupole and can be filled with reaction (or collision) gases (ammonia, methane, oxygen or hydrogen), with one gas type at a time or a mixture of two of them, which reacts with the introduced sample, eliminating some of the interference.

The integrated Collisional Reaction Cell (iCRC) used by Analytik Jena ICP-MS is a mini-collision cell installed in front of the parabolic ion mirror optics that removes interfering ions by injecting a collisional gas (He), or a reactive gas (H_{2}), or a mixture of the two, directly into the plasma as it flows through the skimmer cone and/or the sampler cone. The iCRC removed interfering ions using a collisional kinetic energy discrimination (KED) phenomenon and chemical reactions with interfering ions similarly to traditionally used larger collision cells.

== Routine maintenance ==
As with any piece of instrumentation or equipment, there are many aspects of maintenance that need to be encompassed by daily, weekly and annual procedures. The frequency of maintenance is typically determined by the sample volume and cumulative run time that the instrument is subjected to.

One of the first things that should be carried out before the calibration of the ICP-MS is a sensitivity check and optimization. This ensures that the operator is aware of any possible issues with the instrument and if so, may address them before beginning a calibration. Typical indicators of sensitivity are Rhodium levels, Cerium/Oxide ratios and DI water blanks. One common standard practice is to measure a standard tuning solution provided by the ICP manufacturer every time the plasma torch is started. Then the instrument is auto-calibrated for optimum sensitivity and the operator obtains a report providing certain parameters such as sensitivity, mass resolution and estimated amount of oxidized species and double-positive charged species.

One of the most frequent forms of routine maintenance is replacing sample and waste tubing on the peristaltic pump, as these tubes can get worn fairly quickly resulting in holes and clogs in the sample line, resulting in skewed results. Other parts that will need regular cleaning and/or replacing are sample tips, nebulizer tips, sample cones, skimmer cones, injector tubes, torches and lenses. It may also be necessary to change the oil in the interface roughing pump as well as the vacuum backing pump, depending on the workload put on the instrument.

== Sample preparation ==
For most clinical methods using ICP-MS, there is a relatively simple and quick sample prep process. The main component to the sample is an internal standard, which also serves as the diluent. This internal standard consists primarily of deionized water, with nitric or hydrochloric acid and indium and/or gallium. The addition of volatile acids allows for the sample to decompose into its gaseous components in the plasma which minimizes the ability for concentrated salts and solvent loads to clog the cones and contaminate the instrument. Depending on the sample type, usually 5 mL of the internal standard is added to a test tube along with 10–500 microliters of sample. This mixture is then vortexed for several seconds or until mixed well and then loaded onto the autosampler tray. For other applications that may involve very viscous samples or samples that have particulate matter, a process known as sample digestion may have to be carried out before it can be pipetted and analyzed. This adds an extra first step to the above process and therefore makes the sample prep more lengthy.
