= Nose cone =

Foremost tip of aircraft, rockets, and missiles

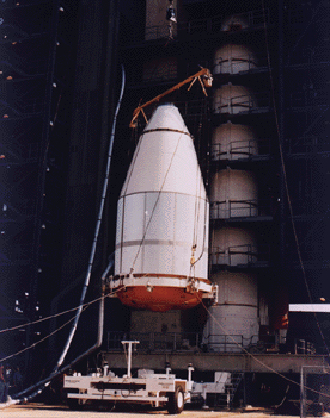
A nose cone that contained one of the Voyager spacecraft, mounted on top of a Titan III/Centaur launch vehicle.

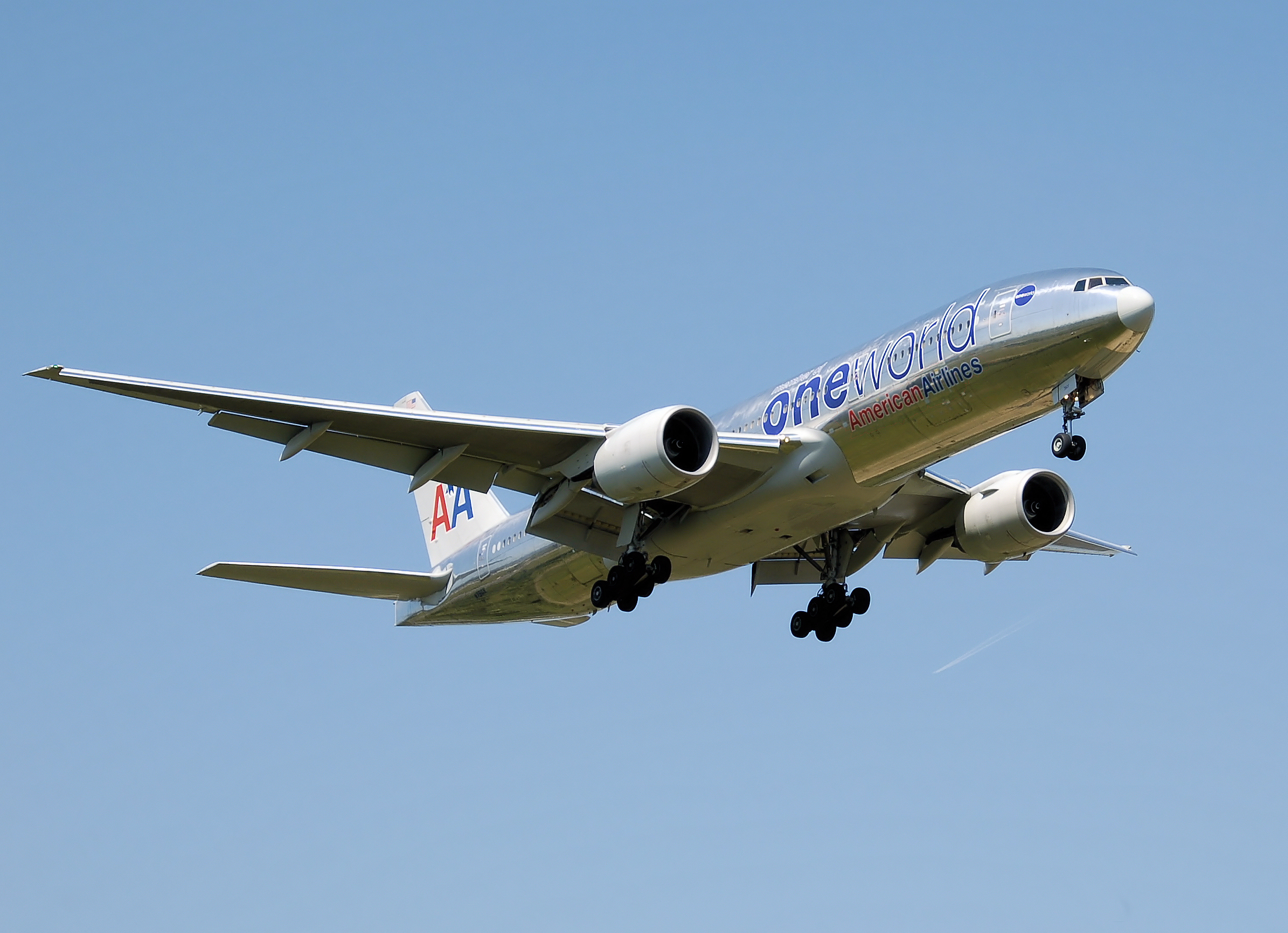
Boeing 777-200ER of American Airlines. The nose cone is the most forward fuselage piece (painted white here).

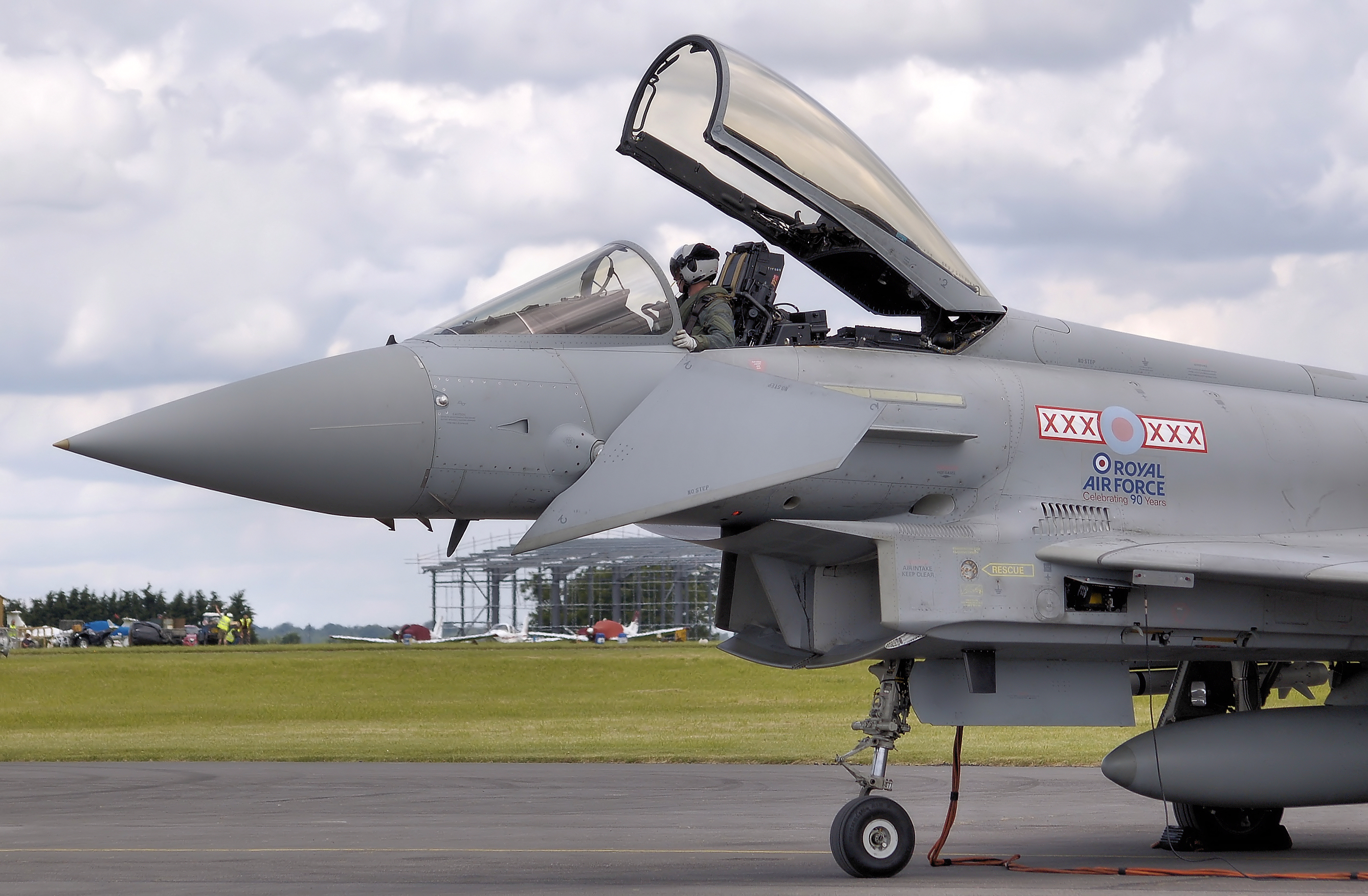
The nose cone of an RAF Typhoon F2.

A nose cone is the conically shaped forwardmost section of a rocket, guided missile or aircraft, designed to modulate oncoming airflow behaviors and minimize aerodynamic drag. Nose cones are also designed for submerged watercraft such as submarines, submersibles and torpedoes, and in high-speed land vehicles such as rocket cars and velomobiles.

== Rockets ==
On a suborbital rocket vehicle it consists of a chamber or chambers in which instruments, animals, plants, or auxiliary equipment may be carried, and an outer surface built to withstand high temperatures generated by aerodynamic heating. Much of the fundamental research related to hypersonic flight was done towards creating viable nose cone designs for the atmospheric reentry of spacecraft and ICBM reentry vehicles.

In a satellite launch vehicle, the nose cone may become the satellite itself after separating from the final stage of the rocket, or it may be used as a payload fairing to shield the satellite until out of the atmosphere, then separating (often in two halves) from the satellite.

== Aircraft ==
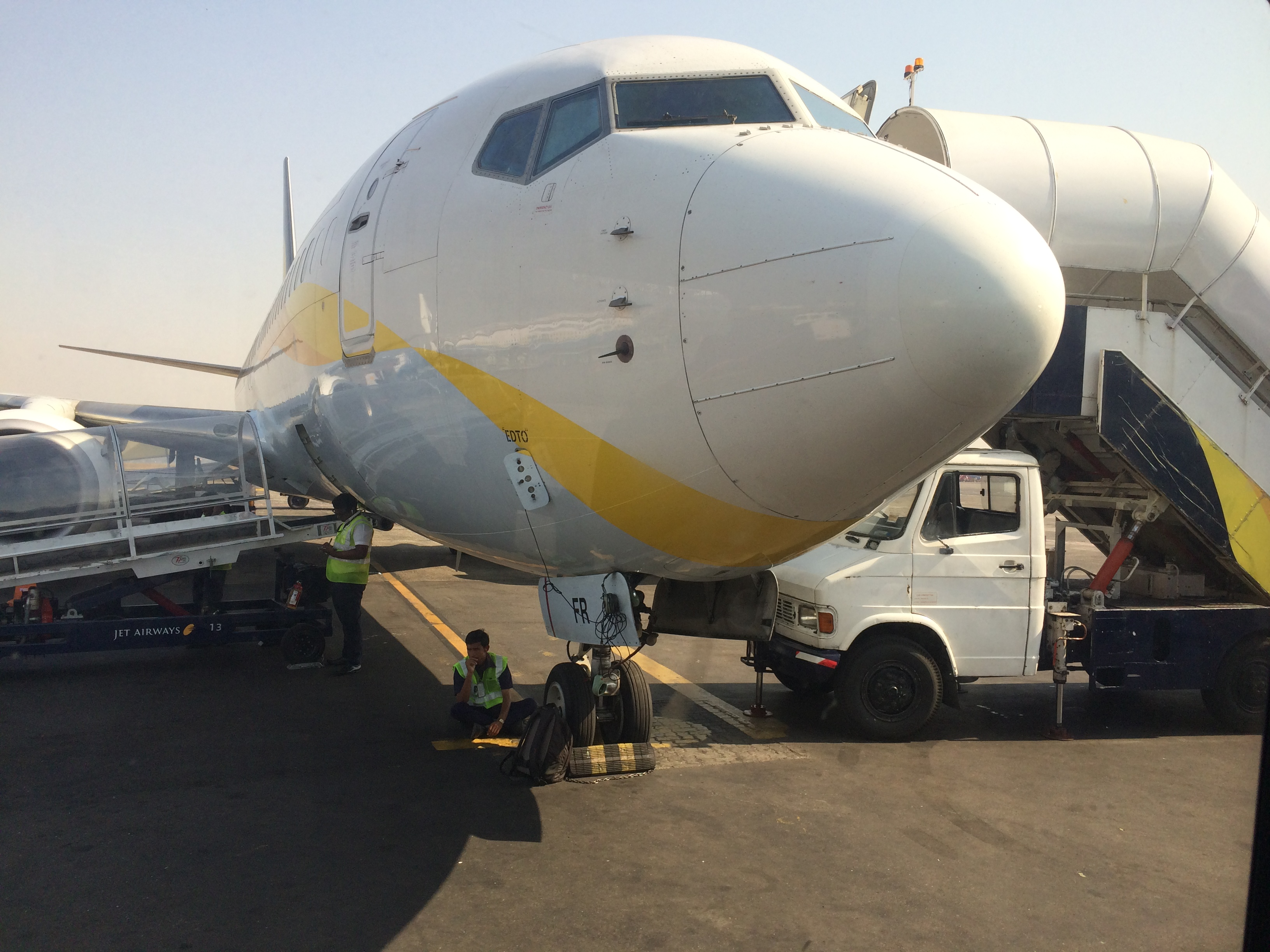
Nosecone of a Jet Airways Boeing 737.

On airliners the nose cone is also a radome protecting the weather radar from aerodynamic forces.

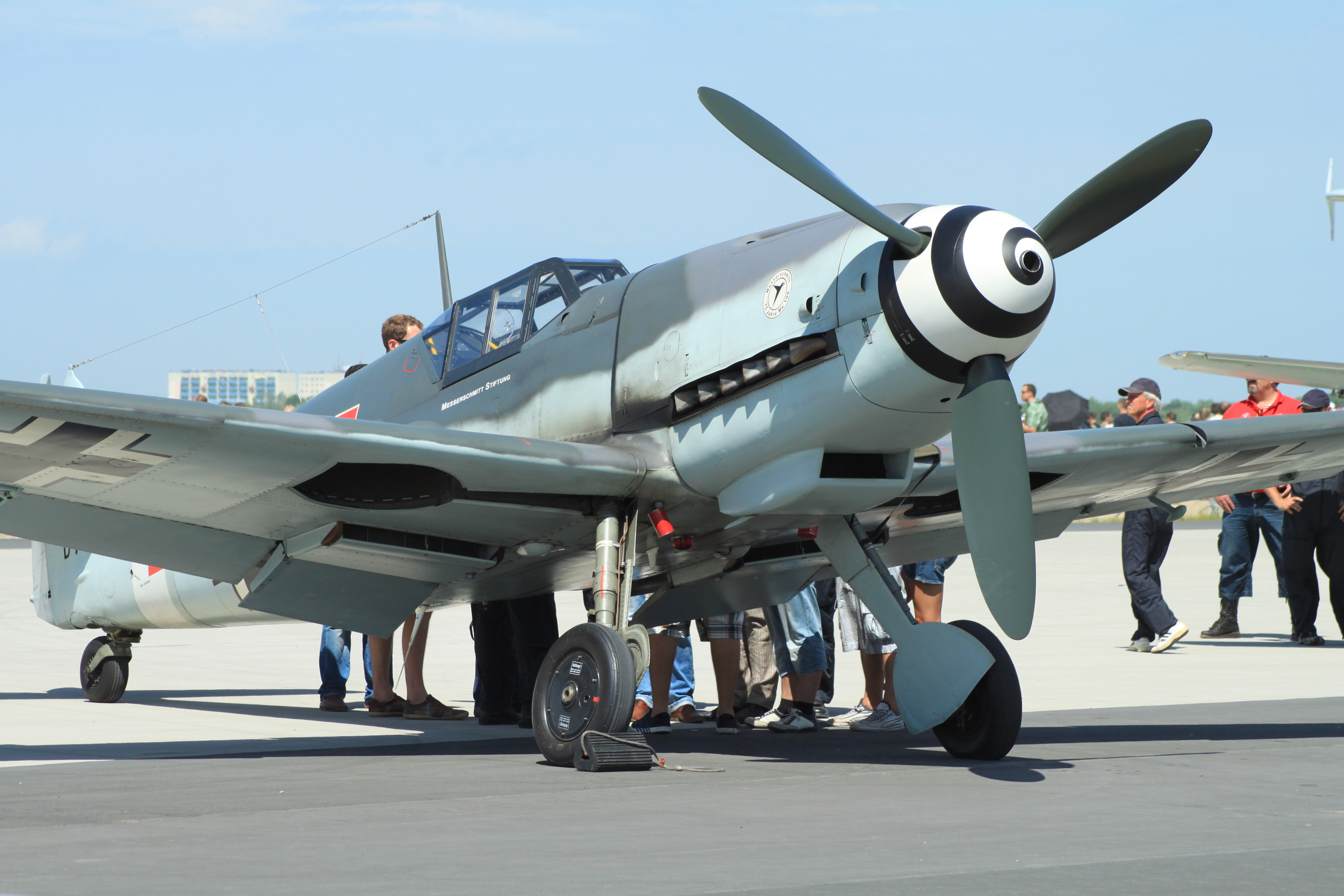
A Messerschmitt Bf 109G. In pursuit of minimising weight and drag, the Bf 109's main gun was mounted in the fuselage with the barrel coaxial to the hollow propeller shaft, exiting via a blast tube in the nose cone - a rare configuration, but not unique to the Bf 109.

The shape of the nose cone must be chosen for minimum drag so a solid of revolution is used that gives least resistance to motion. The article on nose cone design contains possible shapes and formulas.

== Supersonic ==
Due to the extreme temperatures involved, nose cones for high-speed applications (e.g. Supersonic speeds or atmospheric reentry of orbital vehicles) have to be made of refractory materials. Pyrolytic carbon is one choice, reinforced carbon-carbon composite or HRSI ceramics are other popular choices. Another design strategy is using ablative heat shields, which get consumed during operation, disposing of excess heat that way. Materials used for ablative shields include, for example carbon phenolic, polydimethylsiloxane composite with silica filler and carbon fibers, or as in of some Chinese FSW reentry vehicles, oak wood.

In general, the constraints and goals for atmospheric reentry conflict with those for other high-speed flight applications; during reentry a high-drag blunt reentry shape is frequently used, which minimises the heat transfer by creating a shock wave that stands off from the vehicle, but some very-high-temperature materials may permit sharper-edged designs.

== Design ==
Given the problem of the aerodynamic design of the nose cone section of any vehicle or body meant to travel through a compressible fluid medium (such as a rocket or aircraft, missile or bullet), an important problem is the determination of the nose cone geometrical shape for optimum performance. For many applications, such a task requires the definition of a solid of revolution shape that experiences minimal resistance to rapid motion through such a fluid medium, which consists of elastic particles.

== See also ==
- Aircraft fairing
- Droop nose (aeronautics)
- Inlet cone
- Payload fairing
- Nose bullet
