= Pyrolytic carbon =

Material similar to graphite

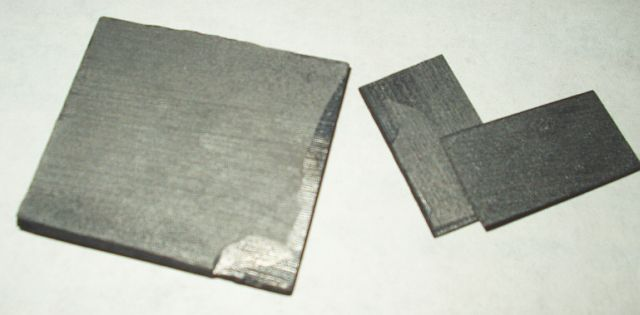
Sheets of pyrolytic carbon

Pyrolytic carbon is a material similar to graphite, but with some covalent bonding between its graphene sheets as a result of imperfections in its production.

Pyrolytic carbon is man-made and is thought not to be found in nature. Generally it is produced by heating a hydrocarbon nearly to its decomposition temperature, and permitting the graphite to crystalize (pyrolysis).

One method is to heat synthetic fibers in a vacuum, producing carbon fibers.

It is used in high-temperature applications such as missile nose cones, rocket motors, heat shields, laboratory furnaces, in graphite-reinforced plastic, in coating nuclear fuel particles, and in biomedical prostheses.

It was developed in the late 1950s as an extension of the work on refractory vapor deposition of metals.

== Physical properties ==
Pyrolytic graphite samples usually have a single cleavage plane, similar to mica, because the graphene sheets crystallize in a planar order, as opposed to pyrolytic carbon, which forms microscopic randomly oriented zones. Because of this, pyrolytic graphite exhibits several unusual anisotropic properties. It is more thermally conductive along the cleavage plane than pyrolytic carbon, making it one of the best planar thermal conductors available.

Pyrolytic graphite forms mosaic crystals with controlled mosaicities up to a few degrees.

Pyrolytic graphite is also more diamagnetic (χ = −4×10^{−4}) against the cleavage plane, exhibiting the greatest diamagnetism (by weight) of any room-temperature diamagnet. In comparison, pyrolytic graphite has a relative permeability of 0.9996, whereas bismuth has a relative permeability of 0.9998 (table).

== Magnetic levitation ==
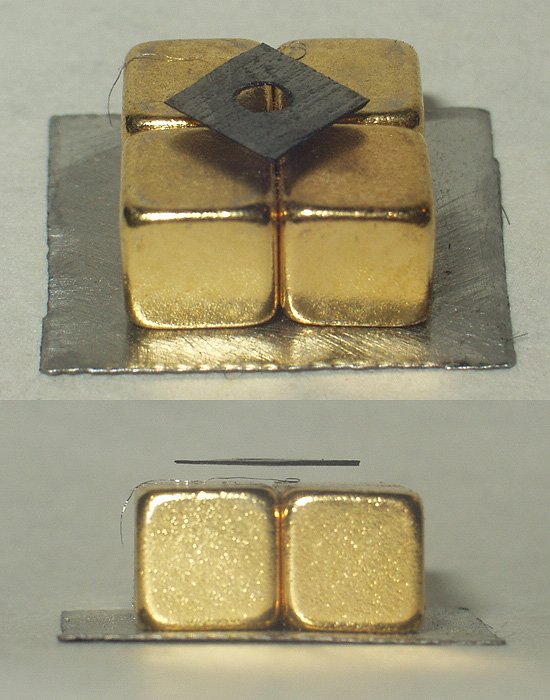
Pyrolytic graphite levitating over permanent magnets

Few materials can be made to magnetically levitate stably above the magnetic field from a permanent magnet. Although magnetic repulsion is obviously and easily achieved between any two magnets, the shape of the field causes the upper magnet to push off sideways rather than remaining supported, rendering stable levitation impossible for magnetic objects (see Earnshaw's theorem). Strongly diamagnetic materials, however, can levitate above powerful magnets.

With the easy availability of rare-earth permanent magnets developed in the 1970s and 1980s, the strong diamagnetism of pyrolytic graphite makes it a convenient demonstration material for this effect.

In 2012, a research group in Japan demonstrated that pyrolytic graphite can respond to laser light or sufficiently powerful natural sunlight by spinning or moving in the direction of the field gradient. The carbon's magnetic susceptibility weakens upon sufficient illumination, leading to an unbalanced magnetization of the material and movement when using a specific geometry.

Pyrolytic carbon may be responsible for the mysterious 'spokes' in Saturn's rings. Via chemical vapor deposition onto silicates in Saturn's B ring, methane gas at high temperatures (1400K) could be converted to pyrolytic carbon. Due to this highly diamagnetic carbon coating interacting with Saturn's equatorial magnetic field, the silicate grains can levitate above and below the ring plane. Exposed to sunlight, the pyrolytic carbon-coated grains lose electrons due to the photoelectric effect, become paramagnetic, and are pulled back into the main ring structure by the same equatorial magnetic field.

== Applications ==
- It is used non-reinforced for missile nose cones and ablative (boiloff-cooled) rocket motors.
- In fiber form, it is used to reinforce plastics and metals (see Carbon fiber and Graphite-reinforced plastic).
- Pebble-bed nuclear reactors use a coating of pyrolytic carbon as a neutron moderator for the individual pebbles.
- Used to coat graphite cuvettes (tubes) in graphite furnace atomic absorption furnaces to decrease heat stress, thus increasing cuvette lifetimes.
- Pyrolytic carbon is used for several applications in electronic thermal management: thermal-interface material, heat spreaders (sheets) and heat sinks (fins).
- It is occasionally used to make tobacco pipes.
- It is used to fabricate grid structures in some high-power vacuum tubes.
- It is used as a monochromator for neutron and X-ray scattering studies.
- Prosthetic heart valves
- Radial head prosthesis
- It is also used in automotive industries where a desired amount of friction is required between two components.
- Highly oriented pyrolytic graphite (HOPG) is used as the dispersive element in HOPG spectrometers, which are used for X-ray spectrometry.
- It is used in personal protective gear.

=== Biomedical applications ===
Because blood clots do not easily form on it, it is often advisable to line a blood-contacting prosthesis with this material in order to reduce the risk of thrombosis. For example, it finds use in artificial hearts and artificial heart valves. Blood vessel stents, by contrast, are often lined with a polymer that has heparin as a pendant group, relying on drug action to prevent clotting. This is at least partly because of pyrolytic carbon's brittleness and the large amount of permanent deformation, which a stent undergoes during expansion.

Pyrolytic carbon is also in medical use to coat anatomically correct orthopedic implants, a.k.a. replacement joints. In this application it is currently marketed under the name "PyroCarbon". These implants have been approved by the U.S. Food and Drug Administration for use in the hand for metacarpophalangeal (knuckle) replacements. They are produced by two companies: Tornier (BioProfile) and Ascension Orthopedics. On September 23, 2011, Integra LifeSciences acquired Ascension Orthopedics. The company's pyrolytic carbon implants have been used to treat patients with different forms of osteoarthritis. In January 2021, Integra LifeSciences sold its orthopedics company to Smith+Nephew for $240 million.

The FDA has also approved PyroCarbon interphalangeal joint replacements under the Humanitarian Device Exemption.
