= Inductively coupled plasma atomic emission spectroscopy =

Analytic scientific technique

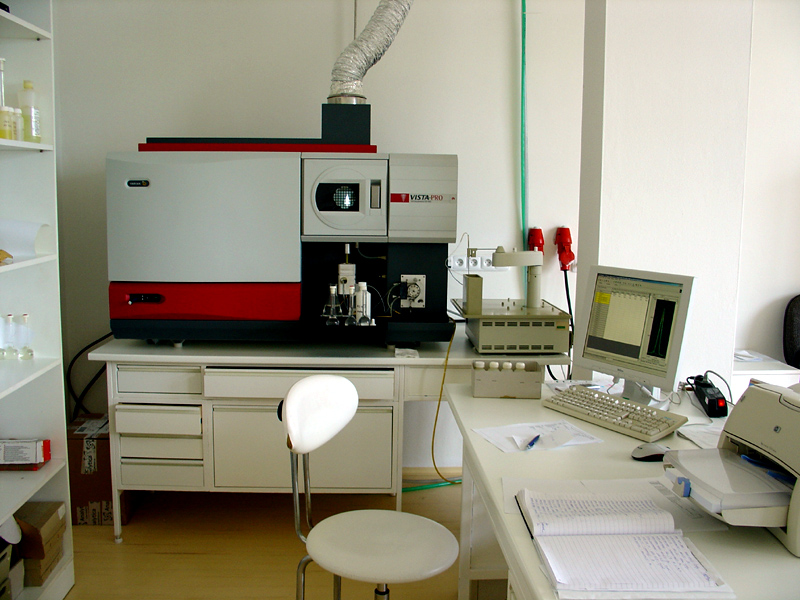
ICP atomic emission spectrometer.

Inductively coupled plasma atomic emission spectroscopy (ICP-AES), also referred to as inductively coupled plasma optical emission spectroscopy (ICP-OES), is an analytical technique used for the detection of chemical elements. It is a type of emission spectroscopy that uses the inductively coupled plasma to produce excited atoms and ions that emit electromagnetic radiation at wavelengths characteristic of a particular element. The plasma is a high temperature source of ionised source gas (often argon). The plasma is sustained and maintained by inductive coupling from electrical coils at megahertz frequencies. The source temperature is in the range from 6000 to 10,000 K. The intensity of the emissions from various wavelengths of light are proportional to the concentrations of the elements within the sample.

== Mechanism ==
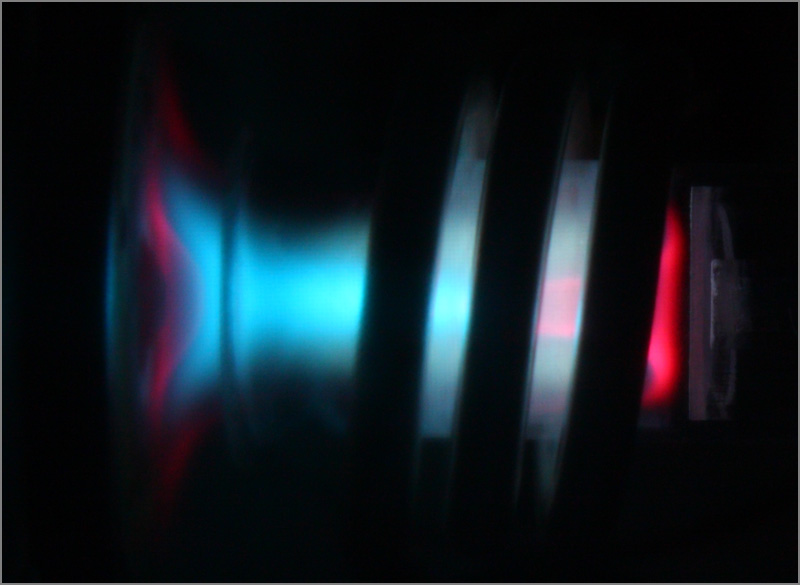
ICP Plasma "torch".

The ICP-AES is composed of two parts: the ICP and the optical spectrometer. The ICP torch consists of 3 concentric quartz glass tubes. The output or "work" coil of the radio frequency (RF) generator surrounds part of this quartz torch. Argon gas is typically used to create the plasma. Modern innovation has made it possible to use nitrogen gas for the ICP

The ICPs have two operation modes, called capacitive (E) mode with low plasma density and inductive (H) mode with high plasma density, and E to H heating mode transition occurs with external inputs. The torch is operated in the H mode.

When the torch is turned on, an intense electromagnetic field is created within the coil by the high power radio frequency signal flowing in the coil. This RF signal is created by the RF generator which is, effectively, a high power radio transmitter driving the "work coil" the same way a typical radio transmitter drives a transmitting antenna. Typical instruments run at either 27 or 40 MHz. The argon gas flowing through the torch is ignited with a Tesla unit that creates a brief discharge arc through the argon flow to initiate the ionization process. Once the plasma is "ignited", the Tesla unit is turned off.

The argon gas is ionized in the intense electromagnetic field and flows in a particular rotationally symmetrical pattern towards the magnetic field of the RF coil. A stable, high temperature plasma of about 7000 K is then generated as the result of the inelastic collisions created between the neutral argon atoms and the charged particles.

A peristaltic pump delivers an aqueous or organic sample into an analytical nebulizer where it is changed into mist and introduced directly inside the plasma flame. The sample immediately collides with the electrons and charged ions in the plasma and is itself broken down into charged ions. The various molecules break up into their respective atoms which then lose electrons and recombine repeatedly in the plasma, giving off radiation at the characteristic wavelengths of the elements involved.

In some designs, a shear gas, typically nitrogen or dry compressed air is used to 'cut' the plasma at a specific spot. One or two transfer lenses are then used to focus the emitted light on a diffraction grating where it is separated into its component wavelengths in the optical spectrometer. In other designs, the plasma impinges directly upon an optical interface which consists of an orifice from which a constant flow of argon emerges, deflecting the plasma and providing cooling while allowing the emitted light from the plasma to enter the optical chamber. Still other designs use optical fibers to convey some of the light to separate optical chambers.

Within the optical chamber(s), after the light is separated into its different wavelengths (colours), the light intensity is measured with a photomultiplier tube or tubes physically positioned to "view" the specific wavelength(s) for each element line involved, or, in more modern units, the separated colors fall upon an array of semiconductor photodetectors such as charge coupled devices (CCDs). In units using these detector arrays, the intensities of all wavelengths (within the system's range) can be measured simultaneously, allowing the instrument to analyze for every element to which the unit is sensitive all at once. Thus, samples can be analyzed very quickly.

The intensity of each line is then compared to previously measured intensities of known concentrations of the elements, and their concentrations are then computed by interpolation along the calibration lines (use of a calibration curve).

In addition, special software generally corrects for interferences caused by the presence of different elements within a given sample matrix.

== History ==
The first published attempt to use plasma emissions as a source for spectroscopic analysis were in 1956 by Eugen Bădărău. In 1964 Stanley Greenfield working at Albright & Wilson was the first to use ICP for non experimental analysis. The first commercial machine was produced by KONTRON in 1975.

== Applications ==
Examples of the application of ICP-AES include the determination of metals in wine, arsenic in food, and trace elements bound to proteins. ICP-AES methods are used to test for metals contamination in drinking water and wastewater. ICP-AES has largely supplanted older analytical methods like gravimetric analysis for routine multi-element trace analysis.

ICP-AES is widely used in minerals processing to provide the data on grades of various streams, for the construction of mass balances.

In 2008, the technique was used at Liverpool University to demonstrate that a Chi Rho amulet found in Shepton Mallet and previously believed to be among the earliest evidence of Christianity in England, only dated to the nineteenth century.

ICP-AES is often used for analysis of trace elements in soil, and it is for that reason it is often used in forensics to ascertain the origin of soil samples found at crime scenes or on victims etc. Taking one sample from a control and determining the metal composition and taking the sample obtained from evidence and determine that metal composition allows a comparison to be made. While soil evidence may not stand alone in court it certainly strengthens other evidence.

It is also fast becoming the analytical method of choice for the determination of nutrient levels in agricultural soils. This information is then used to calculate the amount of fertiliser required to maximise crop yield and quality.

ICP-AES is used for motor oil analysis. Analyzing used motor oil reveals a great deal about how the engine is operating. Parts that wear in the engine will deposit traces in the oil which can be detected with ICP-AES. ICP-AES analysis can help to determine whether parts are failing. In addition, ICP-AES can determine what amount of certain oil additives remain and therefore indicate how much service life the oil has remaining. Oil analysis is often used by fleet manager or automotive enthusiasts who have an interest in finding out as much about their engine's operation as possible. ICP-AES is also used during the production of motor oils (and other lubricating oils) for quality control and compliance with production and industry specifications.

== See also ==
- Ashing
- Atomic absorption spectroscopy
- Atomic emission spectroscopy
- Inductively coupled plasma mass spectrometry
