= Analytical nebulizer =

Type of apparatus that converts liquids into a fine mist

Many of today's current analytical nebulizers, as of 2017

The general term nebulizer refers to an apparatus that converts liquids into a fine mist. Nozzles also convert liquids into a fine mist, but do so by pressure through small holes. Nebulizers generally use gas flows to deliver the mist. The most common form of nebulizers are medical appliances such as asthma inhalers or paint spray cans. Analytical nebulizers are a special category in that their purpose is to deliver a fine mist to spectrometric instruments for elemental analysis. They are necessary parts of inductively coupled plasma atomic emission spectroscopy (ICP-AES), inductively coupled plasma mass spectrometry (ICP-MS), and atomic absorption spectroscopy (AAS).

== Applications ==
Analytical nebulizers are used in trace element analysis. This type of work plays an important role in areas of pharmaceutical and clinical study, biological, environmental and agricultural assessment and petroleum testing. They also have nuclear applications.

== Nebulizer designs ==
Most analytical pneumatic nebulizers use the same essential principle (induction) to atomize the liquid: When gas at a higher pressure exits from a small hole (the orifice) into gas at a lower pressure, it forms a gas jet into the lower pressure zone, and pushes the lower pressure gas away from the orifice. This creates a current in the lower pressure gas zone, and draws some of the lower pressure gas into the higher pressure gas jet. At the orifice, the draw of the lower pressure gas creates considerable suction, the extent depending on the differential pressures, the size of the orifice, and the shape of the orifice and surrounding apparatus. In all pneumatic induction nebulizers, the suction near the orifice is utilized to draw the liquid into the gas jet. The liquid is broken into small droplets in the process.

Present induction pneumatic nebulizer designs fit into 5 categories: 1. Concentric: Liquid flow surrounded by a Gas flow or Gas flow surrounded by a Liquid flow; 2. Cross Flow: Gas flow at right angles to the Liquid flow; 3. Entrained: Gas and Liquid mixed in the system and emitted as a combined flow. 4. Babington and V Groove: Liquid is spread over a surface to decrease the surface tension, and passed over a gas orifice; 5. Parallel Path: Liquid is delivered beside a gas orifice and induction pulls the liquid into the gas stream.

Newer non-induction nebulizers include 3 more categories: 6. Enhanced Parallel Path: Liquid is delivered beside a gas orifice and drawn into the gas stream by surface tension along a spout; 7: Flow Blurring: liquid is injected by pressure into a gas stream; 8. Vibrating Mesh: liquid is pushed through tiny holes by a vibrating ultrasonic plate.

=== Induction nebulizers ===
==== Concentric nebulizers ====
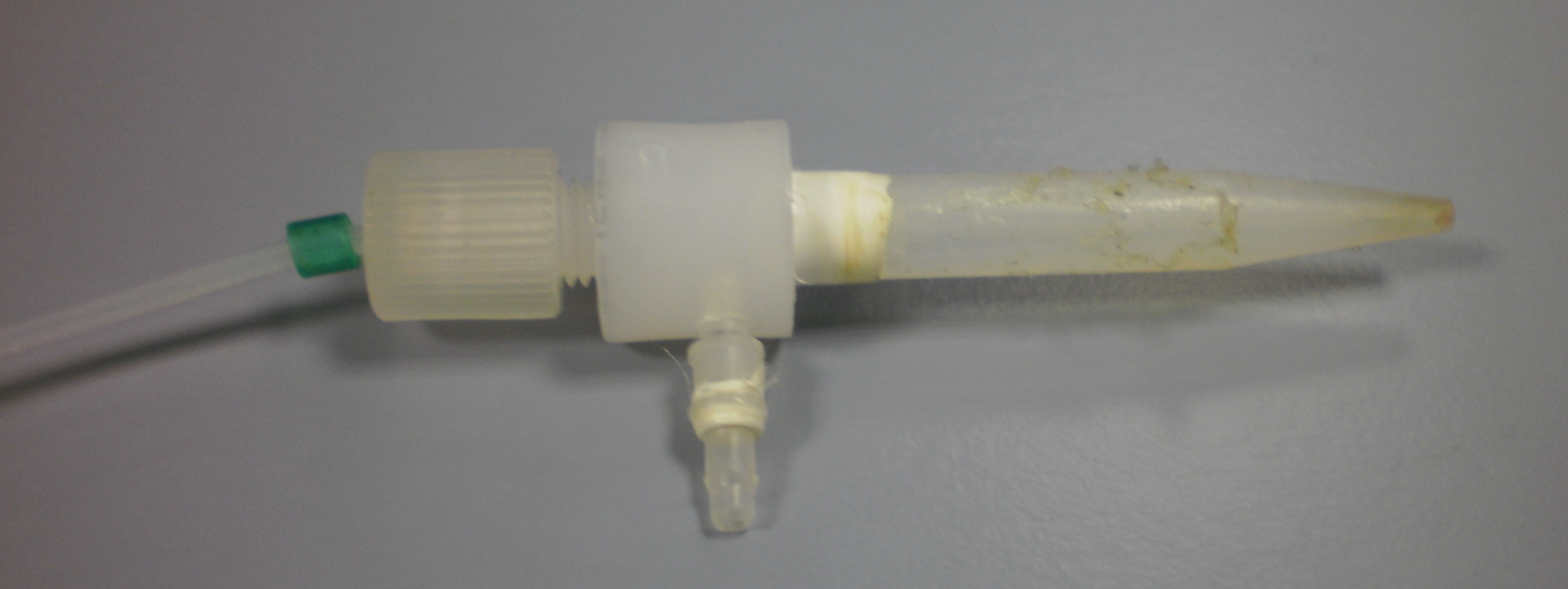
A teflon PFA concentric nebulizer.

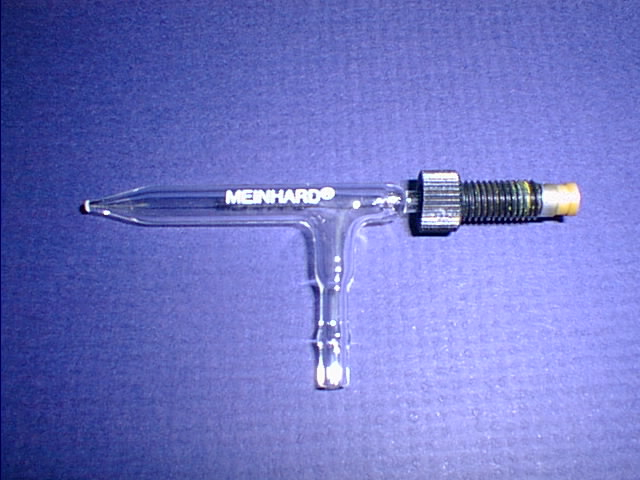
A Meinhard glass concentric nebulizer.

Concentric nebulizers have a central capillary with the liquid and an outer capillary with the gas. The gas draws the liquid into the gas stream through induction, and the liquid is broken into a fine mist as it moves into the gas stream. In theory, the gas and liquid may be switched with the gas in the center and the liquid in the outer capillary, but generally they work better with the gas outside and the liquid inside. The first Canadian concentric patent was Canadian Patent #2405 of April 18, 1873. It was designed to deliver a better spray of oil into a burner. The design is larger but essentially the same as modern analytical nebulizers. The first one developed for spectrometers was a glass design developed by Dr. Meinhard of California in 1973. His design enabled early ICP users to have a consistent sample introduction nebulizer, but it plugged easily. Today many companies produce glass concentrics, and since 1997, Teflon concentrics have become available.

==== Cross flow nebulizers ====
Cross flow nebulizers have a gas capillary set at right angles to the liquid capillary. The gas is blown across the liquid capillary and this produces a low pressure that draws the liquid into the gas stream. Generally the suction is similar to what is produced in a concentric nebulizer. The benefit of a cross flow is that the liquid capillary have a larger inside diameter allowing for more particles to pass through without plugging the nebulizer. The disadvantage is that the mist is usually not as fine or as consistent.

==== Entrained nebulizers ====
There are no analytical nebulizers at present using this technique, but some oil burners do. Mainly used in much older designs as newer concentrics and cross flows are much better and easier to make.

==== V-groove nebulizers ====
V Groove nebulizers are similar to a cross flow in that the liquid is delivered in a capillary at right angles to the gas capillary, but the liquid is poured down a vertically orientated groove that flows past a gas orifice. The gas pulls the liquid into the gas flow and forms a fine mist. These allow for very large ID liquid capillaries, but have no suction and require a pump to feed the liquid to the device. They must be correctly orientated or they do not allow the liquid to flow past the gas stream. And their mist usually produces larger droplets than with concentrics or cross flows.

==== Parallel path nebulizers ====
This design was developed by John Burgener of Burgener Research Inc. Here, the gas stream and sample run through the nebulizer in parallel capillaries. At the tip of the nebulizer, the liquid is pulled into the gas stream and then dispersed into the chamber as a mist.

=== Non-induction nebulizers ===
==== Enhanced parallel path nebulizers ====
This design was developed by John Burgener of Burgener Research Inc. Here, the gas stream and sample run through the nebulizer in parallel capillaries. At the tip of the nebulizer, the liquid is pulled into the gas stream by surface tension along a spout dipping into the gas stream. This allows the gas to impact the liquid, and has the liquid interact in the center of the gas flow where the gas flow speed is highest, producing a better transfer of energy from the gas to the liquid, and producing a finer droplet size. The Burgener Mira Mist nebulizers are the main products using the Enhanced Parallel Path method.

==== Flow blurring nebulizers ====
This is a new type of nebulizer which does not use induction to mix the sample and gas. Instead, pneumatic atomization is employed here, which results in the micro-mixing of fluids using a reflux cell. This means that there is a turbulent mixing of the liquid and gas which results in great sensitivity and is very efficient. The OneNeb is the only example of this sort.

==== Piezoelectric vibrating mesh ====
Since 2011, this variation on ultrasonic nebulizers has been available. There is a vibrating membrane which has micro holes in it. The sample enters through the back and is pushed through the holes as the membrane vibrates. This makes a fine mist with a droplet size proportional to the hole size. This method requires no gas flow, and is used in conjunction with a chamber. If the droplets are less than 5μm then they are too small to stick to the chamber walls and the chamber remains dry while 90–100% of the sample makes it to the torch.

== Chronology of analytical nebulizer development ==
The early history of medical nebulizers can be read here. The development of analytical nebulizers since the introduction of the ICP / ICP-MS is seen below:

1970s Adjustable Cross flow (US patent #4,344,574)

1974 Meinhard Concentric

1978 V-groove (by Suddendorf and Boyer) (US Patent #4,206,160)

1980 Pillar and Post (by Garbarino and Taylor)

1983 GMK Nebulizer: Glass Babington V-groove

1983 Meinhard C-type nebulizer

1983 Precision glassblowing (similar to Minehard A-type)

1983 Jarrell Ash (Thermo) Sapphire V-groove

1983 Meddings' MAK: glass fixed cross flow

1984 Meinhard K-type: recessed inner capillary

1984 Glass Expansion begins making ICP glassware

1985 Burgener-Legere – first commercial teflon nebulizer – V-groove – no adjustable parts

1986 Direct injection micro nebulizer by Fassel, Rice & Lawrence (US patent #4,575,609)

1986 Hildebrand Grid nebulizer

Late 1980s Perkin Elmer Gem Tip cross flow

1988 CETAC Ultrasonic Nebs

1980s Cyclonic chambers

1987 Glass Expansion's first neb – the VeeSpray (ceramic V-groove)

1989 Glass Expansion first concentric – the Conikal (machined instead of glass blown)

1989 Noordermeer Glass V Groove (US patent #4,880,164)

1992 Glass Expansion – non salting Sea Spray

1993 Modified Lichte Glass V-Groove

1993 Burgener BTF – first Parallel Path Neb (US patent #5,411,208)

1994–1995 Main Burgener Parallel Path Nebs – BTS 50, BTN & T2002

Mid 1990s Perkin Elmer GemCone: Miniature V-Groove

With the introduction of the ICP-MS to the laboratory, the creation of micro nebulizers became a priority in order to deliver smaller amounts of sample at lower flow rates.

1993 The Meinhard HEN (high efficiency nebulizer) was produced which handled very low flow rates but salted and plugged easily as a result. (25 times less sample than a standard Meinhard)

1997 Cetac Microconcentric Nebulizer – first Teflon concentric 50, 100, 200 or 400 μL/min

1997 Meinhard Direct Injection HEN – (DIHEN) (US Patent #6,166,379)

1999 Elemental Scientific – PFA Concentric Nebs 20, 50, 100 or 400 μL/min

1999 Burgener Micro 1: Parallel Path

2000 Burgener Micro 3: Parallel Path

2001 Burgener Mira Mist: First Enhanced Parallel Path Nebulizer (US patent #6,634,572)

2004 Epond Typhoon: Glass Concentric

2005 Ingeniatrics OneNeb: Flow Blurring Technology

2010 Epond Lucida: Teflon Micro Concentric

2012 Burgener PFA 250: PFA Micro flow Enhanced Parallel Path Nebulizer

2010 – 2013 Meinhard and Glass Expansion: Significant improvements in attachments and designs of glass concentrics.
