= Graphite furnace atomic absorption =

Graphite furnace atomic absorption spectroscopy (GFAAS), also known as electrothermal atomic absorption spectroscopy (ETAAS), is a type of spectrometry that uses a graphite-coated furnace to vaporize the sample. Briefly, the technique is based on the fact that free atoms will absorb light at frequencies or wavelengths characteristic of the element of interest (hence the name atomic absorption spectrometry). Within certain limits, the amount of light absorbed can be linearly correlated to the concentration of analyte present. Free atoms of most elements can be produced from samples by the application of high temperatures. In GFAAS, samples are deposited in a small graphite or pyrolytic carbon coated graphite tube, which can then be heated to vaporize and atomize the analyte. The atoms absorb ultraviolet or visible light and make transitions to higher electronic energy levels. Applying the Beer-Lambert law directly in AA spectroscopy is difficult due to variations in the atomization efficiency from the sample matrix, and nonuniformity of concentration and path length of analyte atoms (in graphite furnace AA). Concentration measurements are usually determined from a working curve after calibrating the instrument with standards of known concentration. The main advantages of the graphite furnace comparing to aspiration atomic absorption are the following:

- The detection limits for the graphite furnace fall in the ppb range for most elements
- Interference problems are minimized with the development of improved instrumentation
- The graphite furnace can determine most elements measurable by aspiration atomic absorption in a wide variety of matrices.

== System components ==
GFAA spectrometry instruments have the following basic features: 1. a source of light (lamp) that emits resonance line radiation; 2. an atomization chamber (graphite tube) in which the sample is vaporized; 3. a monochromator for selecting only one of the characteristic wavelengths (visible or ultraviolet) of the element of interest; 4. a detector, generally a photomultiplier tube (light detectors that are useful in low-intensity applications), that measures the amount of absorption; 5. a signal processor-computer system (strip chart recorder, digital display, meter, or printer).

== Mode of operation ==
Most currently available GFAAs are fully controlled from a personal computer that has Windows-compatible software. The software easily optimizes run parameters, such as ramping cycles or calibration dilutions. Aqueous samples should be acidified (typically with nitric acid, HNO_{3}) to a pH of 2.0 or less. GFAAs are more sensitive than flame atomic absorption spectrometers, and have a smaller dynamic range. This makes it necessary to dilute aqueous samples into the dynamic range of the specific analyte. GFAAS with automatic software can also pre-dilute samples before analysis. After the instrument has warmed up and been calibrated, a small aliquot (usually less than 100 microliters (μL) and typically 20 μL) is placed, either manually or through an automated sampler, into the opening in the graphite tube. The sample is vaporized in the heated graphite tube; the amount of light energy absorbed in the vapor is proportional to atomic concentrations. Analysis of each sample takes from 1 to 5 minutes, and the results for a sample is the average of triplicate analysis. Faster graphite furnace techniques have been developed utilising the injection of samples into a pre-heated graphite tube.

== Standards ==
- ASTM E1184-10: "Standard Practice for Determination of Elements by Graphite Furnace Atomic Absorption Spectrometry."
- ASTM D3919-08: "Standard Practice for Measuring Trace Elements in Water by Graphite Furnace Atomic Absorption Spectrophotometry."
- ASTM D6357-11: "Test Methods for Determination of Trace Elements in Coal, Coke, & Combustion Residues from Coal Utilization Processes by Inductively Coupled Plasma Atomic Emission, Inductively Coupled Plasma Mass, & Graphite Furnace Atomic Absorption Spectrometry."

== See also ==
- Atomic absorption spectroscopy
