= Forensic glass analysis =

Forensic glass analysis is the application and analysis of glass to determine details about a crime. Glass evidence comes in many forms in various types of criminal cases. Glass can be analyzed to understand its origin using comparative analysis which may include measurements relating to physical match, refractive index, density and elemental analysis. It is also possible to analyze glass fractures to better understand the angle, direction and sequence of force as well as the projectile used.

== In case work ==
Glass analysis is applicable to a wide range of forensic cases. In burglary or rape cases, window pane may be broken and analyzed. In assaults, broken glass bottles may be found and analyzed in addition to glass fragments that may remain on clothing. Glass analysis is also applicable to motor vehicle crashes, particularly hit and run cases, as glass from headlights can be analyzed.

== Collection from crime scenes ==
Depending on the form of the evidence, glass analysis can be collected in several ways. When possible, it is preferred that the entire item of evidence, such as a glass fragment or sweater with glass shards, is collected. Glass evidence can also take on the form of trace evidence. In these cases, trace evidence lifters, forensic vacuums or tweezers can aid in the collection of the glass evidence. Small glass fragments or shards can be secured in a pharmacist's fold and in an envelope. It is also important that the location from where the glass was recovered is noted. When it is suspected that an individual has small glass fragments on their person, their hair can be combed and caught on examination paper in an attempt to recover potential glass fragments. In addition to combing the hair, the individual can remove their clothes on examination paper which can then be sealed and saved for examination at a later time.

== Methods of analysis ==
=== Comparative analysis ===
It is possible to compare multiple glass fragments using the techniques described below in order to understand if the glass fragments can be excluded as originating from the same source.

=== Physical match ===
Two glass fragments may be physically matched with one another. This may exclude the glass fragments from having originated from a different source.

=== Refractive index ===
The refractive index of a glass fragment may be determined and compared with that of another glass fragment in order to understand if they can be excluded from having originated from the same source. The refractive index can be determined using immersion methods as well as automated methods. Immersion methods entail the use of liquids with known refractive indices. The glass fragments are immersed in the liquids, often oils, and Becke lines are examined according to the Becke line test. Automated methods entail a camera and computer which make measurements of glass fragments in varying temperatures.

=== Density ===
The density of a glass fragment can be determined using a density meter. The density of a glass fragment will depend on the batch characteristics and composition. Although, density is tested less frequently than refractive indices, it can be used to determine if two glass fragments more likely originated from a different source.

=== Elemental analysis ===
Many techniques can be used to understand the elemental composition of a glass fragment. Glass fragments from the same source have the same elemental composition and thus, elemental analysis enables an analyst to understand if multiple glass fragments likely do or do not originate from the same source.

There are many techniques that can be used for elemental analysis of glass. These include scanning electron microscopy-x-ray spectroscopy, x-ray fluorescence spectroscopy, mass spectrometry, optical emission spectroscopy and inductively coupled plasma methods.

=== Glass fractures ===
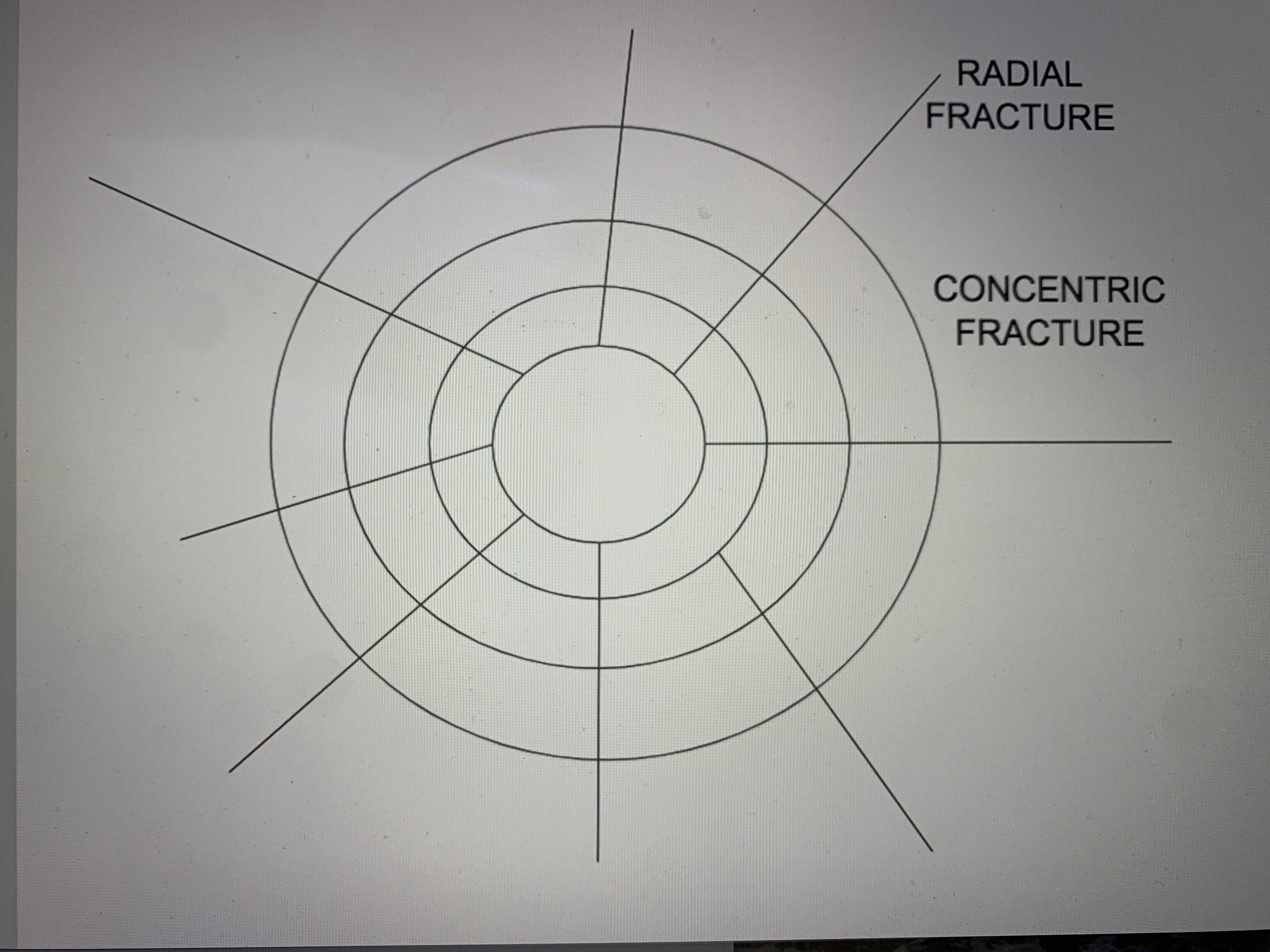
Radial and concentric fractures in glass fractures

Glass fractures can be analyzed in order to determine which side of the glass was force applied that ultimately resulted in its fracture. For example, determining which side of a window was smashed in order to cause it to break may help crime scene investigators understand if someone broke in through the window or broke out through it. On the other hand, if there are multiple fractures on a pane of glass, they can be analyzed to determine what was the order in which the fractures were made. Analysis of glass fractures may also provide insight about the direction through which the projectile came from and may provide hints about what the projectile was that cause the fracture.

When a projectile, such as a rock or bullet, hits a pane of glass, radial and concentric fractures form. These are often the key components of glass fracture analysis.

=== Projectile ===
When a high velocity projectile, such as a bullet, fractures a pane of glass, it can leave what is known as a cone fracture. A cone fracture is a hole in a glass pane surrounded by radial and concentric fractures. The hole is narrower at the point of entry and widens towards the exit point, giving the appearance of a cone.

=== Angle of force ===
The shape of the hole formed by a projectile may also give information about the angle through which the force was delivered. A symmetrical hole could be formed by a projectile hitting the glass at a 90-degree angle, while elliptical holes can be formed by projectiles hitting a pane of glass from the left or right side.

=== Direction of force ===
The side from which a glass fracture was made can be determined by examining the radial fractures of a glass fracture. The 3R rule is used to make a determination about which direction a fracture was formed from. The 3R rule states "radial fractures make right angles to the rear." By examining the radial fractures and the direction in which they form a right angle, the rear side of the pane of glass (opposite the side the force was applied) can be determined.

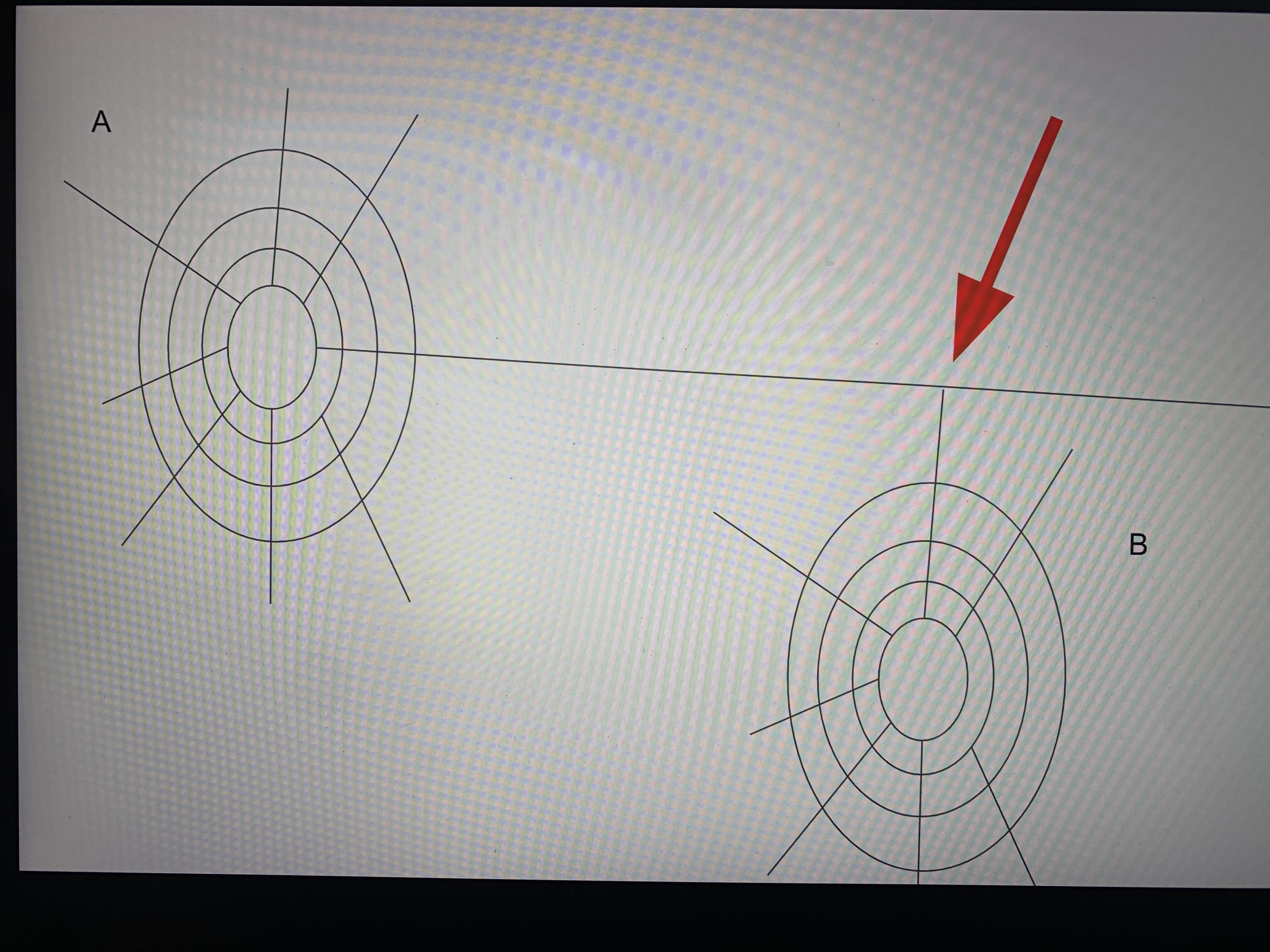
Glass fracture A was formed before B. This can be determined by examining the area outlined by the red arrow in which the radial fracture of B is interrupted by that of A.

=== Sequence of force ===
When multiple fractures are made to a pane of glass, it is possible to understand the order in which those fractures were made by examining the radial fractures. Radial fractures end when they cross paths with another existing fracture line, thereby producing a method to understand the order in which multiple fractures were made.

== History of Forensic Glass Analysis ==
Forensic glass analysis research has been conducted for many years. The first forensic book published on analyzing glass was written by Hans Gross. This book focused on exit, entry and the order of multiple bullet holes in glass for reconstruction purposes. Gross' research was confirmed in 1931 by Matwejeff when he also conducted experiments similar to Gross' and his own. From his own research, he was the first to show Wallner lines, also shown as conchoidal or rib lines. The first case in forensic glass fragments analysis was published by Marris when glass fragments found tied a suspect to the crime scene. Based on the work by Marris and Matwejeff, F.G Tryhorn also published writing in this field that explained examinations of glass including chemical composition. Further research in this field was done by Nelson and Revell in 1967, followed by Coleman and Goode who used neutron activity for element analysis.

Many research projects and government groups continue to update and strengthen the field of forensic glass analysis. An example of a group is the Scientific Working Group on Materials (SWGMAT). This group creates and creates analytical guild lines to improve glass analysis, beginning in the 1990s. From laboratory trials to accepted methods, the field of forensic glass analysis is able to standardize emerging practices.
