= Atomic absorption spectroscopy =

Type of spectroanalytical procedure

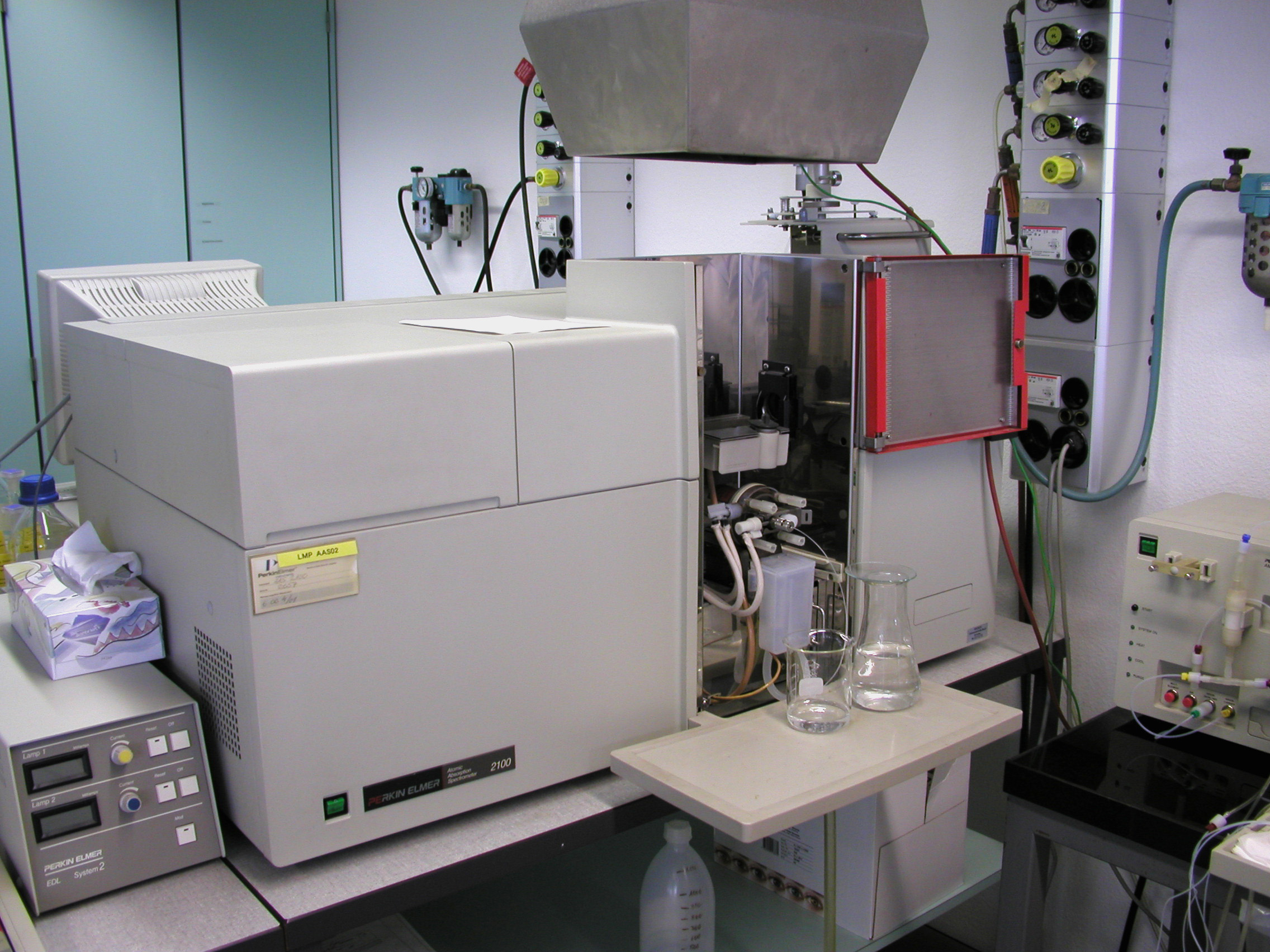
Flame atomic absorption spectroscopy instrument

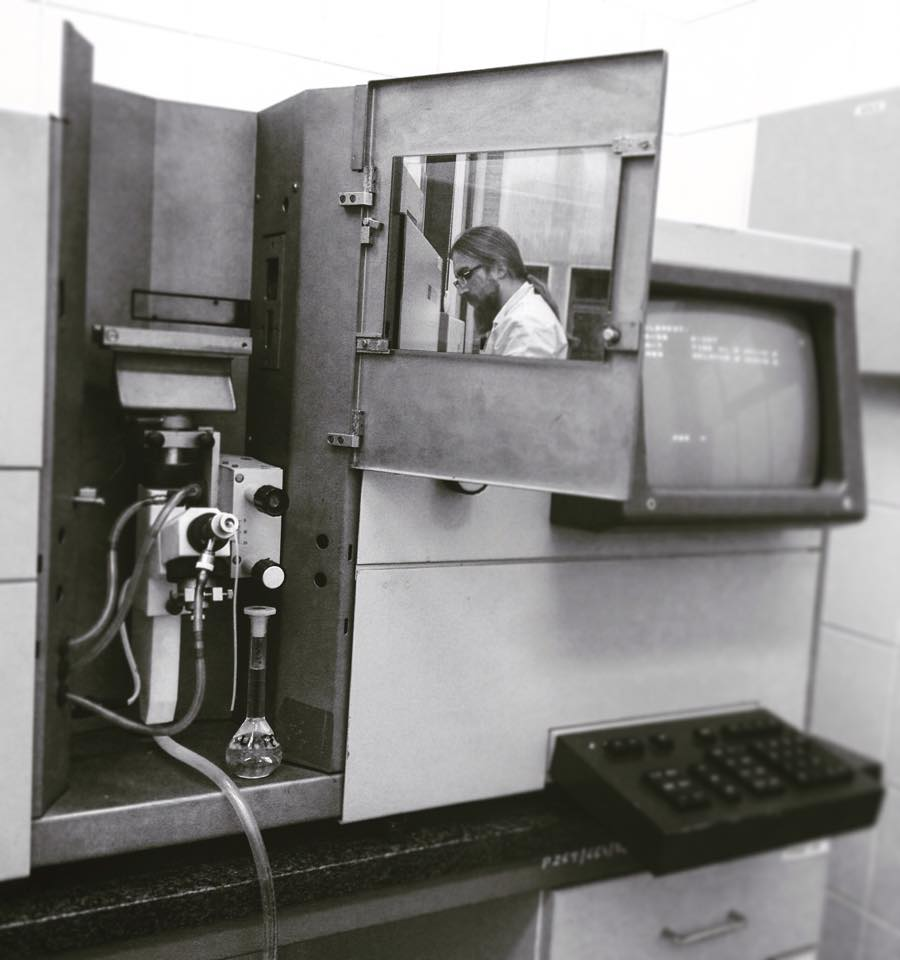
A scientist preparing solutions for atomic absorption spectroscopy, reflected in the glass window of the AAS's flame atomizer cover door

Atomic absorption spectroscopy (AAS) is an elemental analysis method for determining the concentration of metals in a given sample.

The principle of AAS relies on the vaporization of metals within a sample when introduced to a flame. Every ground state metal absorbs light radiation (and excites) at a different wavelength. This uniqueness allows each metallic element to have its own absorption spectrum that corresponds to its identity. The total absorbed radiation at a specific wavelength by an element in the sample is proportional to the density of atoms of the element. The quantification of this relationship is used to determine the concentration of specific metals in the sample.

== History ==
The modern form of AAS was largely developed during the 1950s by a team of Australian chemists led by Sir Alan Walsh at the Commonwealth Scientific and Industrial Research Organisation, Division of Chemical Physics, in Melbourne, Australia.

Alan Walsh first described AAS in an article titled "The Application of Atomic Absorption Spectra to Chemical Analysis" published in 1955 by the journal Spectrachemica Acta. In this article, Walsh emphasizes the importance of establishing a new technique that can provide an absolute method that can produce reliable chemical standards, which was not available at the time. He posits that instead of using emissive spectroscopy methods, an absorptive spectroscopic method can be used to achieve precise results. In 1960, James W. Robinson emphasizes that the main advantage of AAS is its ability to not be effected by environmental factors like other elements present in the experimental space. Before AAS, flame photometry was commonly used to determine the concentration of metal ions which can produce a wide array of results due to its sensitivity to aspects such as elements present in the air, flame temperature, and solvents. AAS circumvents these issues almost completely due to its reliance on the physical properties and interactions of atoms which are majority present in the ground state compared to the majority excited state atoms in flame photometry. Such comparisons highlight the utility of AAS as a novel technique at the time.

In the early 2000s, scientists turned toward high resolution line continuum AAS (HS LC AAS) which was considered revolutionary in the field since the invention of AAS as HS LC AAS was able to overcome previous limitations. Such limitations include issues like accurate background measurement and correction. Around this time, the first commercial instrument for HS LC AAS also became available.

== Instrumentation ==
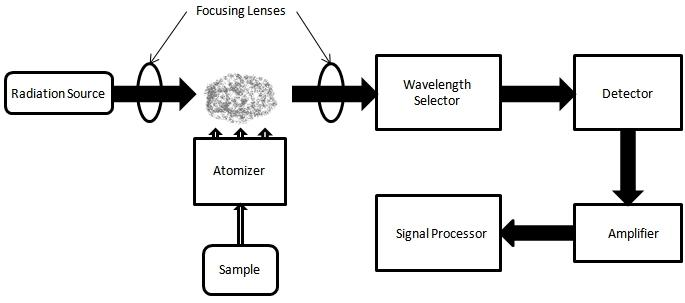
Atomic absorption spectrometer block diagram

An atomic absorption spectrometer contains many components such as the radiation source, atomizer, focusing lenses, monochromator, detector, amplifier, signal processor, and finally, the sample. However, the most crucial parts of this instrument are the radiation source and atomizer.

=== Radiation sources ===
Radiation sources in spectrometers are what excite the atoms in the provided sample. They provide two outputs: continuum and line sources. Continuum sources are able to emit electromagnetic radiation in a wide range of wavelengths. Line sources emit electromagnetic radiation at specific wavelengths.

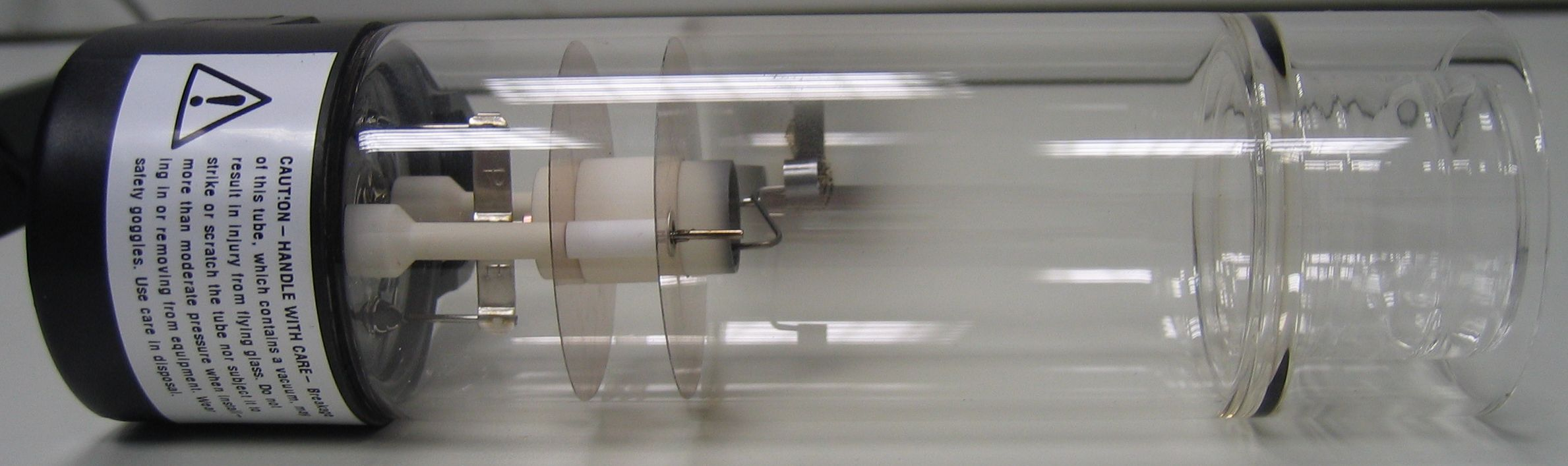
Hollow cathode lamp (HCL)

==== Hollow cathode lamps ====
Hollow cathode lamps (HCL) are a common radiation source used in AAS. The HCL is filled with an inert gas at low pressure. Inside, there is a hollow cup, the cathode, that contains the sample. The anode is a tungsten wire. Once a high voltage is applied across the anode and cathode, the gas begins to ionize. The gas ions accelerate towards the cathode, collide with the metal, and sputter atoms from the material. These metal ions are excited and emit specific wavelengths of radiation that allow for element identification.

Often, single element lamps are used where the cathode consists predominantly of compounds with the target element. These single element lamps provide precision with specific and stable emission lines that are element specific. Multi-element lamps are available with combinations of compounds containing the target elements as the cathode but are less accurate. Multi-element lamps have slightly less sensitivity than single element lamps, so the combinations must be selected carefully to avoid spectral interference. Atomic absorption spectrometers can feature as few as 1-2 hollow cathode lamp positions or, in automated multi-element spectrometers, 8-12 lamp positions may be available. Usually, separate single element lamps are used for different elements.

==== Electrodeless discharge lamps ====
Electrodeless discharge lamps (EDL) are another radiation source used in AAS. EDL is frequently used instead of HCL when the desired sample consists of volatile metals (e.g. Arsenic) or lower sensitivity metals (e.g. Antimony). A small quantity of the metallic sample is sealed in an evacuated quartz tube filled with a low-pressure inert gas, most commonly Argon. The sealed tube is then placed into a microwave discharge cavity which allows for the gas to transform into a plasma state. The plasma state gas excites the metal atoms. The excited metal ions emit wavelengths that are then detected and organized into a spectrum.

EDLs need a separate power supply and might need a longer time to stabilize.

==== Deuterium lamps ====
Deuterium HCL, hydrogen HCL, and deuterium discharge lamps are used in line source AAS for background correction. The radiation intensity emitted by these lamps decreases significantly with increasing wavelength, so that they can be only used in the wavelength range between 190 and about 320 nm.

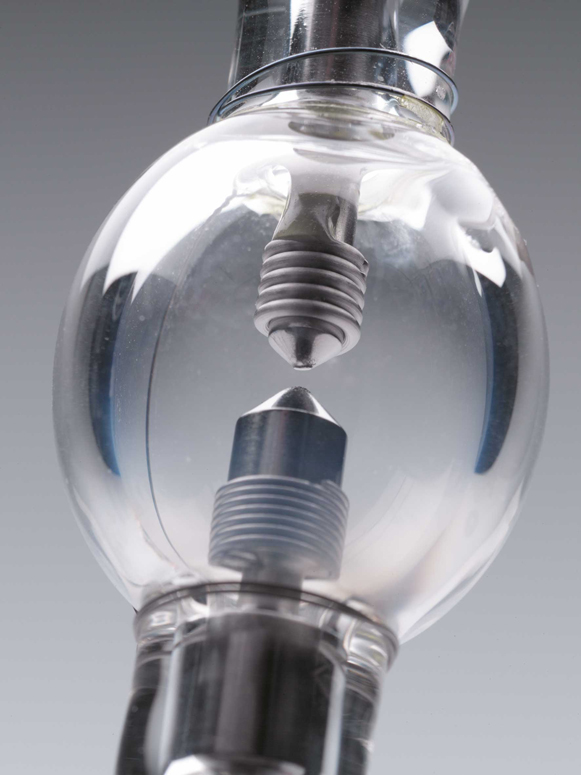
Xenon lamp as a continuous radiation source

==== Continuum sources ====
When a continuum radiation source is used for AAS, it is necessary to use a high-resolution monochromator. The lamp emits radiation of an intensity at least an order of magnitude above that of a typical HCL: wavelengths ranging from 190 nm to 900 nm. A special high-pressure xenon short arc lamp, operating in a hot-spot mode, has been developed to be used as the continuum radiation source.

=== Source Type AAS ===
AAS can be performed with either line source emissions or continuum source emissions.

==== Line Source AAS ====
In line source AAS (LS AAS), the high resolution that is required for the measurement of atomic absorption is provided by the narrow line emission of the radiation source. The monochromator has to resolve the analytical line from other radiation emitted by the lamp. This can usually be accomplished with a band pass between 0.2 and 2 nm, i.e., a medium-resolution monochromator. Another feature to make LS AAS element-specific is modulation of the primary radiation and the use of a selective amplifier that is tuned to the same modulation frequency, as already postulated by Alan Walsh. This way any (unmodulated) radiation emitted for example by the atomizer can be excluded, which is imperative for LS AAS. Simple monochromators of the Littrow or (better) the Czerny-Turner design are typically used for LS AAS. Photomultiplier tubes are the most frequently used detectors in LS AAS, although solid state detectors might be preferred because of their better signal-to-noise ratio.

==== Continuum Source AAS ====
When a continuum radiation source is used for AAS, a high-resolution monochromator is required. The resolution must be equal to or better than the half-width of an atomic absorption line (about 2 pm) in order to avoid loss of sensitivity and linearity of the calibration graph. These spectrometers use a compact double monochromator with a prism pre-monochromator and an echelle grating monochromator for high resolution. A linear charge-coupled device (CCD) array with 200 pixels is used as the detector. The second monochromator does not have an exit slit; hence the spectral environment at both sides of the analytical line becomes visible at high resolution. As typically only 3–5 pixels are used to measure the atomic absorption, the other pixels are available for correction purposes. One of these corrections is for lamp flicker noise, which is independent of wavelength, resulting in measurements with very low noise level; other corrections are for background absorption, to be discussed further.

=== Atomizers ===
Atomizers are what allow for atomization in AAS. Atomization is the process in which the separation of molecules into individual atoms occurs. Specifically atomizers in AAS are able to perform this process by introducing the sample to a high temperature flame so free atoms can be produced.

==== Flame atomizers ====
The oldest and most commonly used atomizers in AAS are flames, principally the air-acetylene (C_{2}H_{2}) flame with a temperature of about 2300 °C, and the nitrous oxide (N_{2}O)-acetylene flame with a temperature of about 2700 °C. The latter flame offers a more reducing environment, ideally suited for analytes with a high affinity to oxygen.

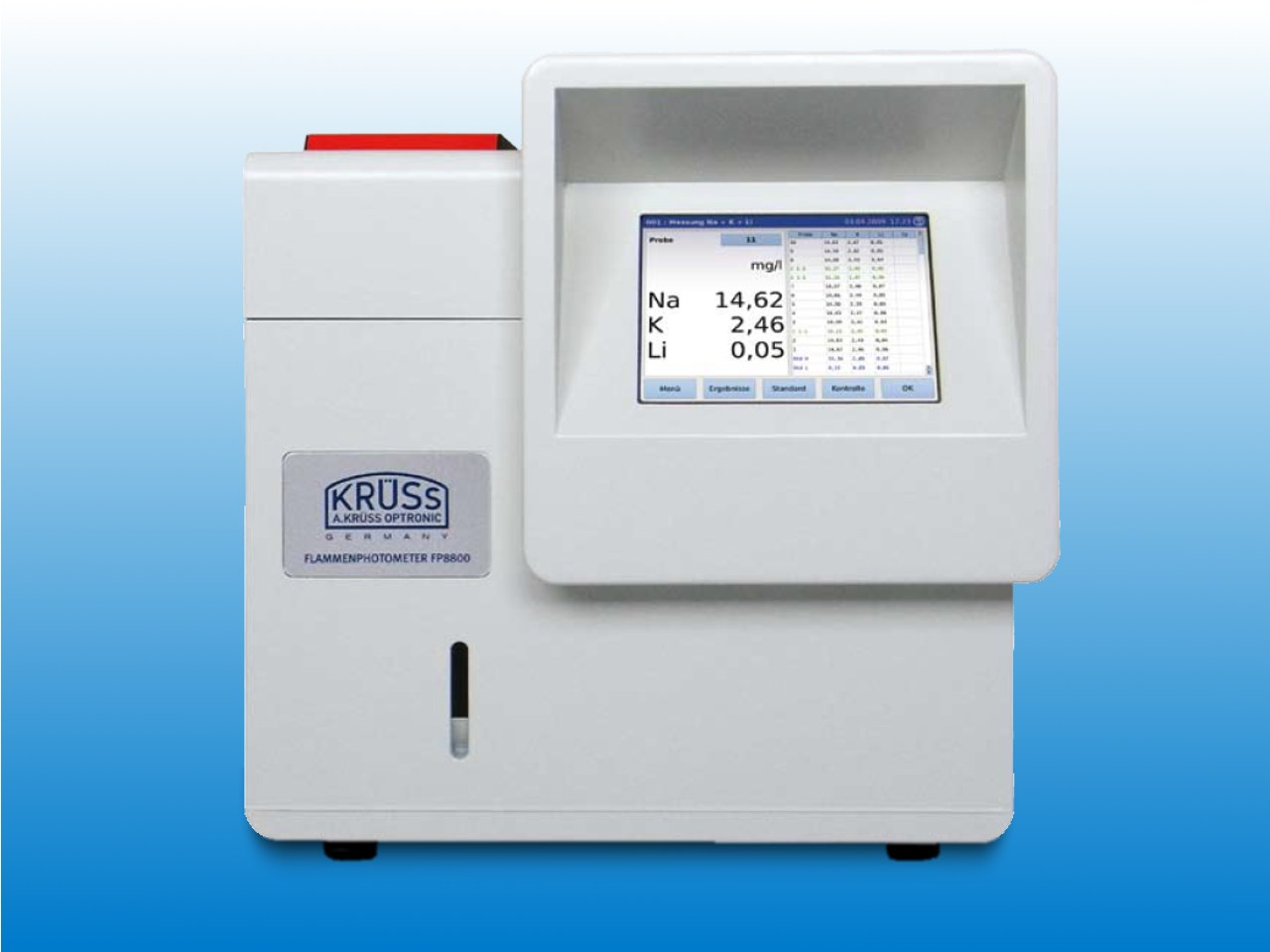
A laboratory flame photometer that uses a propane operated flame atomizer

Liquid or dissolved samples are typically used with flame atomizers. The sample solution is aspirated by a pneumatic analytical nebulizer, transformed into an aerosol, which is introduced into a spray chamber, where it is mixed with the flame gases and conditioned so that only the finest droplets (< 10 μm) enter the flame. This conditioning reduces interference, but causes only about 5% of the solution to reach the flame.

On top of the spray chamber is a burner head that produces a flame that is laterally long (usually 5–10 cm) and only a few mm deep. The radiation beam passes through the long axis, and the flame gas flow-rates may be adjusted to produce the highest concentration of free atoms. The burner height may also be adjusted so that the radiation beam passes through the zone of highest atom cloud density in the flame, resulting in the highest sensitivity.

The flame processes include:

- desolvation (drying), in which the solvent is evaporated leaving the dry sample nano-particles
- vaporization, in which the solid particles are converted into gaseous molecules
- atomization in which the molecules are dissociated into free atoms, and
- ionization, where (depending on the ionization potential of the analyte atoms and the energy of the flame) atoms may be partially converted to gaseous ions

Each of these stages includes the risk of interference if the degree of phase transfer is different for the analyte in the calibration standard and in the sample. Ionization is usually undesirable, as it reduces the number of atoms that are available for measurement, i.e., the sensitivity.

In flame AAS, a steady-state signal is generated while the sample is aspirated. This technique is typically used for determinations in the mg/L range and may be extended down to a few μg/L for some elements.

==== Electrothermal atomizers ====
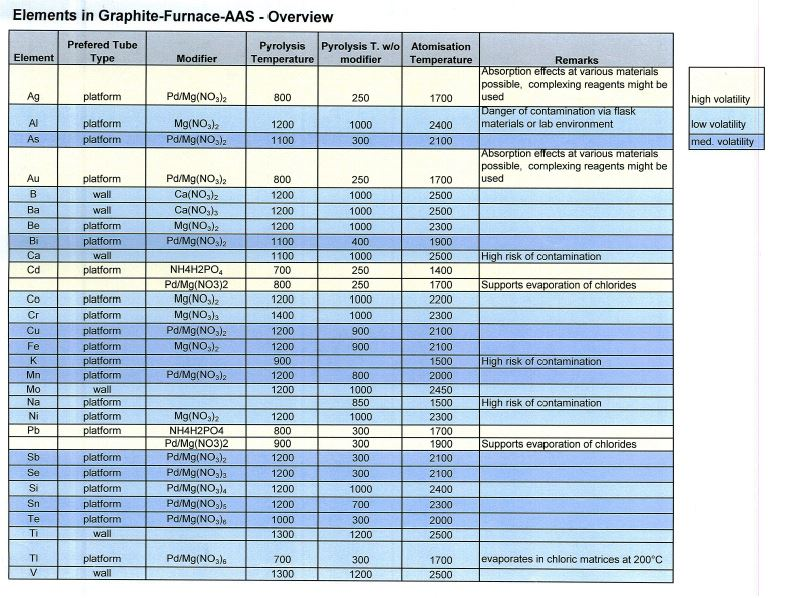
GFAA method development

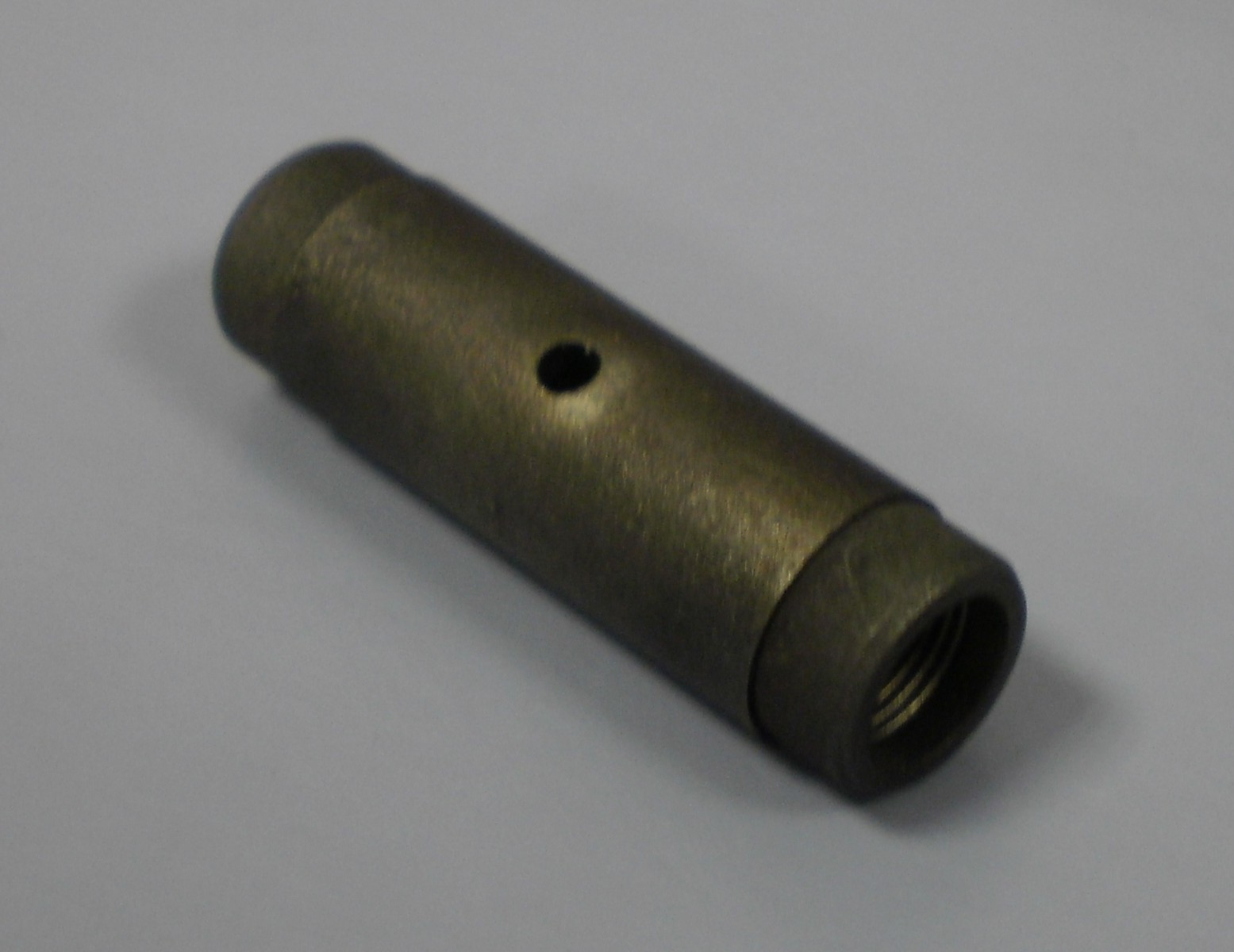
Graphite tube

Electrothermal AAS (ET AAS) using graphite tube atomizers was pioneered by Boris V. L'vov at the Saint Petersburg Polytechnical Institute, Russia, since the late 1950s, and investigated in parallel by Hans Massmann at the Institute of Spectrochemistry and Applied Spectroscopy (ISAS) in Dortmund, Germany.

Although a wide variety of graphite tube designs have been used over the years, typical dimensions are 20–25 mm in length and 5–6 mm inner diameter. With this technique liquid/dissolved, solid, and gaseous samples may be analyzed directly. A measured volume (typically 10–50 μL) or a weighed mass (typically around 1 mg) of a solid sample is introduced into the graphite tube and subject to a temperature program. This typically consists of stages of drying – the solvent is evaporated; pyrolysis – the majority of the matrix constituents are removed; atomization – the analyte element is released to the gaseous phase; and cleaning – residues left in the graphite tube are removed at high temperature.

The graphite tubes are heated via their ohmic resistance using a low-voltage high-current power supply; the temperature in the individual stages can be controlled very closely, and temperature ramps between the individual stages facilitate the separation of sample components. Tubes may be heated transversely or longitudinally, with the former method having a more homogeneous temperature distribution. The so-called stabilized temperature platform furnace (STPF), proposed by Walter Slavin, based on research of Boris L'vov, makes ET AAS essentially free from interference. The major components of this concept are atomization of the sample from a graphite platform inserted into the graphite tube (L'vov platform) instead of from the tube wall in order to delay atomization until the gas phase in the atomizer has reached a stable temperature; use of a chemical modifier to stabilize the analyte to a pyrolysis temperature that is sufficient to remove the majority of the matrix components; and integration of the absorbance over the time of the transient absorption signal instead of using peak height absorbance for quantification.

In ET AAS, a transient signal is generated, the area of which is directly proportional to the mass of analyte (not its concentration) introduced into the graphite tube. This technique has the advantage that any kind of sample, solid, liquid, or gaseous, can be analyzed directly. Its sensitivity is 2–3 orders of magnitude higher than that of flame AAS, so that determinations in the low μg L^{−1} range (for a typical sample volume of 20 μL) and ng g^{−1} range (for a typical sample mass of 1 mg) can be carried out. It has a very high degree of freedom from interferences, so that ET AAS may be considered the most robust technique available for the determination of trace elements in complex matrices.

==== Specialized atomization techniques ====
While flame and electrothermal vaporizers are the most common atomization techniques, several other methods are available for specialized use.

===== Glow-discharge atomization =====
A glow-discharge device (GD) is a versatile source, as it can simultaneously introduce and atomize the sample. The glow discharge occurs in a low-pressure argon gas atmosphere between 1 and 10 torr. In this atmosphere is a pair of electrodes applying a DC voltage of 250 to 1000 V to break down the argon gas into positively charged ions and electrons. These ions, under the influence of the electric field, are accelerated into the cathode surface containing the sample, bombarding the sample and causing neutral sample atom ejection through sputtering. The atomic vapor produced by this discharge is composed of ions, ground state atoms, and a fraction of excited atoms. When the excited atoms relax back into their ground state, a low-intensity glow is emitted, giving the technique its name.

The requirement for samples of glow discharge atomizers is that they are electrical conductors. Consequently, atomizers are most commonly used in the analysis of metals and other conducting samples. However, with proper modifications, it can be used to analyze liquid samples as well as nonconducting materials by mixing them with a conductor (e.g. graphite).

===== Hydride atomization =====
Hydride generation techniques use specialized solutions of specific elements. The technique provides a means of introducing samples containing arsenic, antimony, selenium, bismuth, and lead into an atomizer in the gas phase. With these elements, hydride atomization enhances detection limits by a factor of 10 to 100 compared to alternative methods. Hydride generation occurs by adding an acidified aqueous solution of the sample to a 1% aqueous solution of sodium borohydride, all of which is contained in a glass vessel. The volatile hydride generated by the reaction that occurs is swept into the atomization chamber by an inert gas, where it undergoes decomposition. This process forms an atomized form of the analyte, which can then be measured by absorption or emission spectrometry.

===== Cold-vapor atomization =====
Cold-vapor atomization is a method limited to the determination of mercury due to it being the only metallic element with a high vapor pressure at ambient temperature. Because of this, it is important for determining organic mercury compounds in samples and their distribution in the environment. The method begins by converting mercury into Hg^{2+} by oxidation from nitric and sulfuric acids, followed by a reduction of Hg^{2+} with tin(II) chloride. The mercury is then swept into a long-pass absorption tube by bubbling a stream of inert gas through the reaction mixture. The concentration is determined by measuring the absorbance of this gas at 253.7 nm. Detection limits for this technique are in the parts-per-billion range, making it an excellent mercury detection method.

== Background absorption and background correction ==
The relatively small number of atomic absorption lines (compared to atomic emission lines) and their narrow width (a few pm) make spectral overlap rare; there are only few examples known that an absorption line from one element will overlap with another. Molecular absorption, in contrast, is much broader, so that it is more likely that some molecular absorption band will overlap with an atomic line. This kind of absorption might be caused by un-dissociated molecules of concomitant elements of the sample or by flame gases. We have to distinguish between the spectra of di-atomic molecules, which exhibit a pronounced fine structure, and those of larger (usually tri-atomic) molecules that don't show such fine structure. Another source of background absorption, particularly in ET AAS, is scattering of the primary radiation at particles that are generated in the atomization stage, when the matrix could not be removed sufficiently in the pyrolysis stage.

All these phenomena, molecular absorption and radiation scattering, can result in artificially high absorption and an improperly high (erroneous) calculation for the concentration or mass of the analyte in the sample. There are several techniques available to correct for background absorption, and they are significantly different for LS AAS and HR-CS AAS.

=== Background correction techniques in LS AAS ===
In LS AAS background absorption can only be corrected using instrumental techniques, and all of them are based on two sequential measurements: firstly, total absorption (atomic plus background), secondly, background absorption only. The difference of the two measurements gives the net atomic absorption. Because of this, and because of the use of additional devices in the spectrometer, the signal-to-noise ratio of background-corrected signals is always significantly inferior compared to uncorrected signals. It should also be pointed out that in LS AAS there is no way to correct for (the rare case of) a direct overlap of two atomic lines. In essence, there are three techniques used for background correction in LS AAS.

==== Deuterium background correction ====
This is the oldest and still most commonly used technique, particularly for flame AAS. In this case, a separate source (a deuterium lamp) with broad emission is used to measure the background absorption over the entire width of the exit slit of the spectrometer. The use of a separate lamp makes this technique the least accurate one, as it cannot correct for any structured background. It also cannot be used at wavelengths above about 320 nm, as the emission intensity of the deuterium lamp becomes very weak. The use of deuterium HCL is preferable compared to an arc lamp due to the better fit of the image of the former lamp with that of the analyte HCL.

==== Smith-Hieftje background correction ====
This technique (named after their inventors) is based on the line-broadening and self-reversal of emission lines from HCL when high current is applied. Total absorption is measured with normal lamp current, i.e., with a narrow emission line, and background absorption after application of a high-current pulse with the profile of the self-reversed line, which has little emission at the original wavelength, but strong emission on both sides of the analytical line. The advantage of this technique is that only one radiation source is used; among the disadvantages are that the high-current pulses reduce lamp lifetime, and that the technique can only be used for relatively volatile elements, as only those exhibit sufficient self-reversal to avoid dramatic loss of sensitivity. Another problem is that background is not measured at the same wavelength as total absorption, making the technique unsuitable for correcting structured background.

==== Zeeman-effect background correction ====
An alternating magnetic field is applied at the atomizer (graphite furnace) to split the absorption line into three components, the π component, which remains at the same position as the original absorption line, and two σ components, which are moved to higher and lower wavelengths, respectively. Total absorption is measured without magnetic field and background absorption with the magnetic field on. The π component has to be removed in this case, e.g. using a polarizer, and the σ components do not overlap with the emission profile of the lamp, so that only the background absorption is measured. The advantages of this technique are that total and background absorption are measured with the same emission profile of the same lamp, so that any kind of background, including background with fine structure can be corrected accurately, unless the molecule responsible for the background is also affected by the magnetic field and using a chopper as a polariser reduces the signal to noise ratio. While the disadvantages are the increased complexity of the spectrometer and power supply needed for running the powerful magnet needed to split the absorption line.

=== Background correction techniques in HR-CS AAS ===
In HR-CS AAS background correction is carried out mathematically in the software using information from detector pixels that are not used for measuring atomic absorption; hence, in contrast to LS AAS, no additional components are required for background correction.

==== Background correction using correction pixels ====
It has already been mentioned that in HR-CS AAS lamp flicker noise is eliminated using correction pixels. In fact, any increase or decrease in radiation intensity that is observed to the same extent at all pixels chosen for correction is eliminated by the correction algorithm. This obviously also includes a reduction of the measured intensity due to radiation scattering or molecular absorption, which is corrected in the same way. As measurement of total and background absorption, and correction for the latter, are strictly simultaneous (in contrast to LS AAS), even the fastest changes of background absorption, as they may be observed in ET AAS, do not cause any problem. In addition, as the same algorithm is used for background correction and elimination of lamp noise, the background corrected signals show a much better signal-to-noise ratio compared to the uncorrected signals, which is also in contrast to LS AAS.

==== Background correction using a least-squares algorithm ====
The above technique can obviously not correct for a background with fine structure, as in this case the absorbance will be different at each of the correction pixels. In this case, HR-CS AAS is offering the possibility to measure correction spectra of the molecule(s) that is (are) responsible for the background and store them in the computer. These spectra are then multiplied with a factor to match the intensity of the sample spectrum and subtracted pixel by pixel and spectrum by spectrum from the sample spectrum using a least-squares algorithm. This might sound complex, but first of all the number of di-atomic molecules that can exist at the temperatures of the atomizers used in AAS is relatively small, and second, the correction is performed by the computer within a few seconds. The same algorithm can actually also be used to correct for direct line overlap of two atomic absorption lines, making HR-CS AAS the only AAS technique that can correct for this kind of spectral interference.

== Applications ==
AAS is typically used to measure the concentration of metals in a wide variety of substances. For example, AAS has been used to measure the concentration of Zinc in hair and plants, Magnesium in blood serum, Lead in gasoline, and heavy metals in fruits. This variety of applications results in AAS being used in fields from agriculture to medicine.

== See also ==
- Absorption spectroscopy
- Beer–Lambert law
- Inductively coupled plasma mass spectrometry
- Laser absorption spectrometry
