= Quantification (science) =

Act of determining or expressing a quantity

In mathematics and empirical science, quantification (or quantitation) is the act of counting and measuring that maps human sense observations and experiences into quantities. Quantification in this sense is fundamental to the scientific method.

== Natural science ==
Some measure of the undisputed general importance of quantification in the natural sciences can be gleaned from the following comments:

- "these are mere facts, but they are quantitative facts and the basis of science."
- It seems to be held as universally true that "the foundation of quantification is measurement."
- There is little doubt that "quantification provided a basis for the objectivity of science."
- In ancient times, "musicians and artists ... rejected quantification, but merchants, by definition, quantified their affairs, in order to survive, made them visible on parchment and paper."
- Any reasonable "comparison between Aristotle and Galileo shows clearly that there can be no unique lawfulness discovered without detailed quantification."
- Even today, "universities use imperfect instruments called 'exams' to indirectly quantify something they call knowledge."

This meaning of quantification comes under the heading of pragmatics.

In some instances in the natural sciences a seemingly intangible concept may be quantified by creating a scale—for example, a pain scale in medical research, or a discomfort scale at the intersection of meteorology and human physiology such as the heat index measuring the combined perceived effect of heat and humidity, or the wind chill factor measuring the combined perceived effects of cold and wind.

== Social sciences ==
In the social sciences, quantification is an integral part of economics and psychology. Both disciplines gather data – economics by empirical observation and psychology by experimentation – and both use statistical techniques such as regression analysis to draw conclusions from it.

In some instances a seemingly intangible property may be quantified by asking subjects to rate something on a scale—for example, a happiness scale or a quality-of-life scale—or by the construction of a scale by the researcher, as with the index of economic freedom. In other cases, an unobservable variable may be quantified by replacing it with a proxy variable with which it is highly correlated—for example, per capita gross domestic product is often used as a proxy for standard of living or quality of life.

Frequently in the use of regression, the presence or absence of a trait is quantified by employing a dummy variable, which takes on the value 1 in the presence of the trait or the value 0 in the absence of the trait.

Quantitative linguistics is an area of linguistics that relies on quantification. For example, indices of grammaticalization of morphemes, such as phonological shortness, dependence on surroundings, and fusion with the verb, have been developed and found to be significantly correlated across languages with stage of evolution of function of the morpheme.

== Hard versus soft science ==
The ease of quantification is one of the features used to distinguish hard and soft sciences from each other. Scientists often consider hard sciences to be more scientific or rigorous, but this is disputed by social scientists who maintain that appropriate rigor includes the qualitative evaluation of the broader contexts of qualitative data. In some social sciences such as sociology, quantitative data are difficult to obtain, either because laboratory conditions are not present or because the issues involved are conceptual but not directly quantifiable. Thus in these cases qualitative methods are preferred.

== See also ==
- Calibration
- Internal standard
- Isotope dilution
- Physical quantity
- Quantitative analysis (chemistry)
- Standard addition
