= Standard solution =

Solution with a precisely known concentration of something

In analytical chemistry, a standard solution (titrant or titrator) is a solution containing an accurately known concentration. Standard solutions are generally prepared by dissolving a solute of known mass into a solvent to a precise volume, or by diluting a solution of known concentration with more solvent. A standard solution ideally has a high degree of purity and is stable enough that the concentration can be accurately measured after a long shelf time.

Making a standard solution requires great attention to detail to avoid introducing any risk of contamination that could diminish the accuracy of the concentration. For this reason, glassware with a high degree of precision such as a volumetric flask, volumetric pipette, micropipettes, and automatic pipettes are used in the preparation steps. The solvent used must also be pure and readily able to dissolve the solute into a homogenous solution.

Standard solutions are used for various volumetric procedures, such as determining the concentration of solutions with an unknown concentration in titrations. The concentrations of standard solutions are normally expressed in units of moles per litre (mol/L, often abbreviated to M for molarity), moles per cubic decimetre (mol/dm^{3}), kilomoles per cubic metre (kmol/m^{3}), grams per milliliters (g/mL), or in terms related to those used in particular titrations (such as titres).

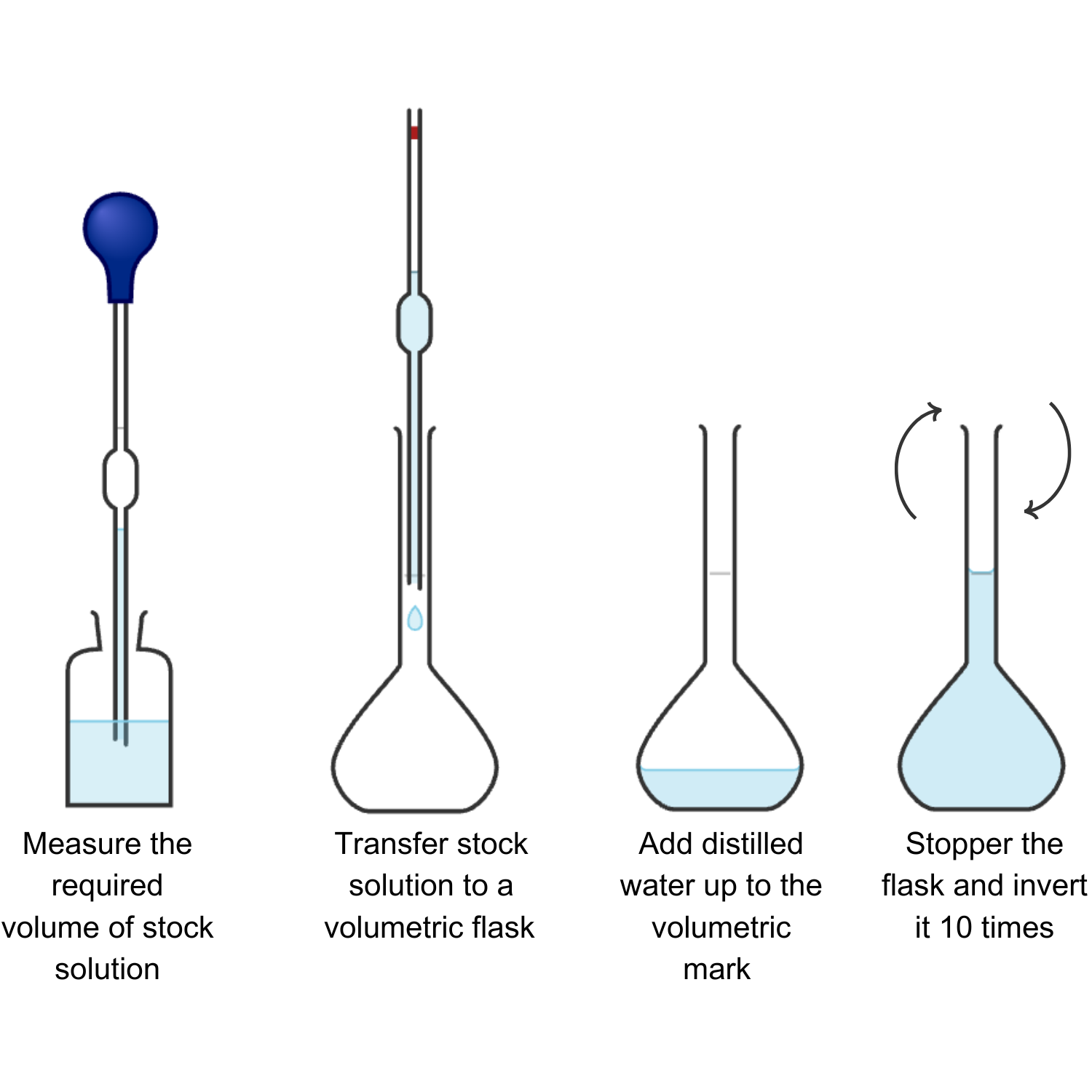
Procedure for creating a standard solution

== Types of standard solutions ==
Standard solutions can be categorized by the type of analyte used to prepare them. These analytical standards can either be a primary standard or a secondary standard.

=== Primary standards ===
Primary standards are compounds with known stoichiometry, high purity, and high stability under standard conditions. The compound must not be hygroscopic to have a mass that accurately represents the exact number of moles when weighed. These characteristics make primary standards reliable for preparing standard solutions with an accurate concentration just by knowing the amount of compound and solvent used. Primary standard solutions are commonly used to determine the concentration of secondary standard solutions through titration. An example of a primary standard is potassium dichromate.

=== Secondary standards ===
Secondary standards do not satisfy the requirements for a primary standard. A standard solution created from a secondary standard cannot have its concentration accurately known without stoichiometric analysis against a primary standard. An example of a secondary standard is sodium hydroxide, a hydroscopic compound that is highly reactive with its surroundings. The concentration of a standard solution made with sodium hydroxide may fluctuate over time due to the instability of the compound, requiring for calibration using a primary standard before use.

== Methods of standardization ==
Standard solutions are commonly used for standardization processes in quantitative analysis to minimize error and maintain accuracy in the results.

=== External standards ===
This is the most common method of standardization which requires one or multiple standards, each containing a known concentration of the same analyte. External standards are analyzed separately from the sample unlike other methods of standardization, hence the name "external". When concentrations of a set of external solutions are plotted against a measured value such as the absorbance of each external solution, a normal calibration curve can be obtained. Multiple samples with unknown concentrations can then be analyzed using this calibration curve which make it a useful tool. The external standardization method can introduce determinate error if the matrix of the unknown solution differs drastically from the external standard. This issue can be accounted for by replicating the matrix of the unknown solution in the external standard with a process called "matrix matching".

=== Internal standards ===
A series of internal standards contain the same concentration of a chemical called the internal standard and different concentrations of the analyte. The internal standard should be chemically similar to the analyte, so that the two receive the same treatment during measurement. Internal standards are used to correct for loss of analyte during sample preparation, for example when the analyte is in a volatile solvent. If both the internal standard and the analyte lose solvent proportionally, their signals will remain identical and the ratio of their signals can be measured.

Plotting the ratio of the analyte signal to the internal standard signal against the analyte concentration results in a calibration curve. Similar to the external calibration curve, the internal calibration curve also allows to calculate the concentration of analyte in an unknown sample.

=== Standard additions ===
In the standard addition method, a standard (usually in the form of a solution) with a known concentration is added in increasing increments to a set of solutions containing the same unknown analyte.The matrix for these solutions are identical which eliminates the matrix effect from changing the signal of the analyte when measured. For this reason, the graph produces a linear slope when a calibration curve is plotted. The concentration of the unknown analyte can then be measured after determining the value of the x-intercept.

== Applications ==
=== Titration ===
In titrations, the concentration of analyte in solution can be determined by titrating the standard solution against the analyte solution to determine the threshold of neutralization. For example, to calculate the concentration of hydrogen chloride, a standard solution of known concentration, such as 0.5 M sodium hydroxide, is titrated against the hydrogen chloride solution.

=== Determination of concentration using a calibration curve ===
Standard solutions are commonly used to determine the concentration of an analyte species via calibration curve. A calibration curve is obtained by measuring a series of standard solutions with known concentrations, which can be used to determine the concentration of an unknown sample using linear regression analysis. For example, by comparing the absorbance values of a solution with an unknown concentration to a series of standard solutions with varying concentrations, the concentration of the unknown can be determined using Beer's Law.

Any form of spectroscopy can be used in this way so long as the analyte species has substantial absorbance in the spectra. The standard solution is a reference guide to discover the molarity of unknown species.

The matrix effect can negatively affect the efficiency of a calibration curve due to interactions between matrix and the analyte response. The matrix effect can be reduced by the addition of internal standards to the standard solutions, or by using the standard addition method.

=== Chromatography ===
Internal standards are used in GC/MS and LC/MS to control for variability introduced by injection, sample preparation and other matrix effects. The ratio of peak areas between the internal standard and analyte is calculated to determine analyte concentration. A common type of internal standard is an isotopically labeled analogue of the analyte, which incorporates one or more atoms of ^{2}H, ^{13}C, ^{15}N and ^{18}O into its structure.

== Example of preparing a series of standard solutions ==
Suppose the concentration of glutamine in an unknown sample needs to be measured. To do so, a series of standard solutions containing glutamine is prepared to create a calibration curve. A table summarizing a method for creating these solutions is shown below:

Table 1: Preparing a set of glutamine standards example
Concentration of glutamine stock solution (g/mL):			7.50 × 10^{−3}
Solution	Glutamine added (mL)	Dilute to mark with:	Resulting Concentration (g/mL)
1 (blank)	0	Deionized water in 25 mL Volumetric Flask	0
2	1	Deionized water in 25 mL Volumetric Flask	3.00 × 10^{−4}
3	2	Deionized water in 25 mL Volumetric Flask	6.00 × 10^{−4}
4	3	Deionized water in 25 mL Volumetric Flask	9.00 × 10^{−4}
5	4	Deionized water in 25 mL Volumetric Flask	1.20 × 10^{−3}

Here, a stock solution of glutamine is added in increasing increments with a high-accuracy instrument and diluted to the same volume in volumetric flasks. The result is 4 standard solutions with varying known concentrations (along with a blank for instrument calibration). The final concentration in each is calculated using the formula for molar concentration.

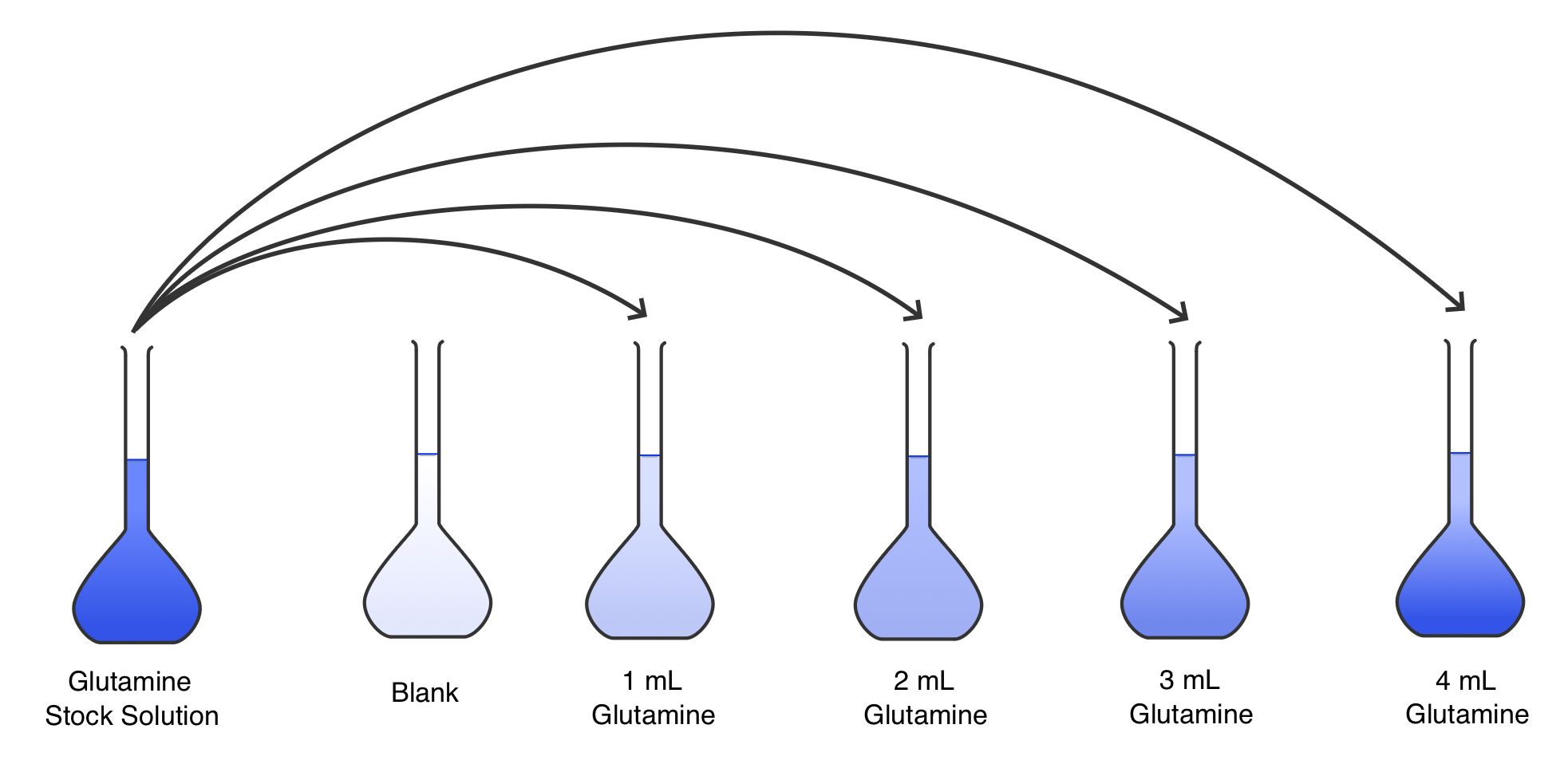
