= Blank value =

A blank value in analytical chemistry is a measurement of a blank. The reading does not originate from a sample, but the matrix effects, reagents and other residues. These contribute to the sample value in the analytical measurement and therefore have to be subtracted.

The limit of blank is defined by the Clinical And Laboratory Standards Institute as the highest apparent analyte concentration expected to be found when replicates of a sample containing no analyte are tested.

== See also ==
- Blank (solution)
