= Quantitative analysis (chemistry) =

Chemical analysis used to determine quantities of substances

In analytical chemistry, quantitative analysis is the determination of the absolute or relative abundance (often expressed as a concentration) of one, several or all particular substance(s) present in a sample. It relates to the determination of percentage of constituents in any given sample.

== Methods ==
Once the presence of certain substances in a sample is known, the study of their absolute or relative abundance could help in determining specific properties. Knowing the composition of a sample is very important, and several ways have been developed to make it possible, like gravimetric and volumetric analysis. Gravimetric analysis yields more accurate data about the composition of a sample than volumetric analysis but also takes more time to perform in the laboratory. Volumetric analysis, on the other hand, doesn't take that much time and can produce satisfactory results. Volumetric analysis can be simply a titration based in a neutralization reaction but it can also be a precipitation or a complex forming reaction as well as a titration based in a redox reaction. However, each method in quantitative analysis has a general specification, in neutralization reactions, for example, the reaction that occurs is between an acid and a base, which yields a salt and water, hence the name neutralization. In the precipitation reactions the standard solution is in the most cases silver nitrate which is used as a reagent to react with the ions present in the sample and to form a highly insoluble precipitate. Precipitation methods are often called simply as argentometry. In the two other methods the situation is the same. Complex forming titration is a reaction that occurs between metal ions and a standard solution that is in the most cases EDTA (Ethylene Diamine Tetra Acetic acid). In the redox titration that reaction is carried out between an oxidizing agent and a reduction agent. There are some more methods like Liebig method / Duma's method / Kjeldahl's method and Carius method for estimation of organic compounds.

For example, quantitative analysis performed by mass spectrometry on biological samples can determine, by the relative abundance ratio of specific proteins, indications of certain diseases, like cancer.

== Quantitative vs. qualitative ==
The general expression Qualitative Analysis [...] refers to analyses in which substances are identified or classified on the basis of their chemical or physical properties, such as chemical reactivity, solubility, molecular weight, melting point, radioactivity properties (emission, absorption), mass spectra, nuclear half-life, etc. Quantitative Analysis refers to analyses in which the amount or concentration of an analyte may be determined (estimated) and expressed as a numerical value in appropriate units. Qualitative Analysis may take place with Quantitative Analysis, but Quantitative Analysis requires the identification (qualification) of the analyte for which numerical estimates are given.

— International Union of Pure and Applied Chemistry (IUPAC), Nomenclature in evaluation of analytical methods including detection and quantification capabilities, Pure Appl. Chem. 67(10), p. 1701 (1995)

The term "quantitative analysis" is often used in comparison (or contrast) with "qualitative analysis", which seeks information about the identity or form of substance present. For instance, a chemist might be given an unknown solid sample. They will use "qualitative" techniques (perhaps NMR or IR spectroscopy) to identify the compounds present, and then quantitative techniques to determine the amount of each compound in the sample. Careful procedures for recognizing the presence of different metal ions have been developed, although they have largely been replaced by modern instruments; these are collectively known as qualitative inorganic analysis. Similar tests for identifying organic compounds (by testing for different functional groups) are also known.

Many techniques can be used for either qualitative or quantitative measurements. For instance, suppose an indicator solution changes color in the presence of a metal ion. It could be used as a qualitative test: does the indicator solution change color when a drop of sample is added? It could also be used as a quantitative test, by studying the color of the indicator solution with different concentrations of the metal ion. (This would probably be done using ultraviolet-visible spectroscopy.)

== See also ==
- Microanalysis
- Isotope dilution
