= List of chemical analysis methods =

A list of chemical analysis methods with acronyms.

== A ==
- Atomic absorption spectroscopy (AAS)
- Atomic emission spectroscopy (AES)
- Atomic fluorescence spectroscopy (AFS)
- Alpha particle X-ray spectrometer (APXS)

== C ==
- Capillary electrophoresis (CE)
- Chromatography
- Colorimetry
- Computed tomography
- Cyclic Voltammetry (CV)

== D ==
- Differential scanning calorimetry (DSC)

== E ==
- Electrodialysis
- Electrolysis
- Electron microscopy
- Electron paramagnetic resonance (EPR) also called Electron spin resonance (ESR)
- Electrophoresis
- Energy Dispersive Spectroscopy (EDS/EDX)
- Electron diffraction (ED)

== F ==
- Field flow fractionation (FFF)
- Flow injection analysis (FIA)
- Fourier transform infrared spectroscopy (FTIR)

== G ==
- Gas chromatography (GC)
- Gas chromatography-mass spectrometry (GC-MS)
- Gas chromatography-IR spectroscopy (GC-IR)
- Gel permeation chromatography-IR spectroscopy (GPC-IR)

== H ==
- High performance liquid chromatography (HPLC)
- High performance liquid chromatography-IR spectroscopy (HPLC-IR)

== I ==
- Ion Microprobe (IM)
- Inductively coupled plasma (ICP)
- Infrared Spectroscopy (IR)
- Ion-mobility spectrometry (IMS)
- Ion selective electrode (ISE) e.g. determination of pH

== L ==
- Laser induced breakdown spectroscopy (LIBS)
- Liquid chromatography-IR spectroscopy (LC-IR)
- Liquid chromatography-mass spectrometry (LC-MS)

== M ==
- Mass spectrometry (MS)
- Mössbauer spectroscopy

== N ==
- Neutron activation analysis
- Nuclear magnetic resonance (NMR)
- Neutron diffraction

== O ==
- Optical microscopy
- Optical emission spectroscopy
- Optical rotation (OR)

== P ==
- Particle induced X-ray emission spectroscopy (PIXE)
- Pyrolysis gas chromatography mass spectrometry (PY-GC-MS)
- Particle size determination by laser diffraction (PSD)

== R ==
- Raman spectroscopy
- Refractive index
- Resonance enhanced multiphoton ionization (REMPI)

== S ==
- Secondary ion mass spectrometry
- Supercritical fluid chromatography (SFC)
- Scanning transmission electron microscopy (STEM)
- Scanning tunneling microscope (STM)
- Scanning electron microscope (SEM)

== T ==
- Transmission electron microscopy (TEM)
- Titration
- Thermogravimetric Analysis (TGA)

== V ==
- Vacuum fusion

== X ==
- X-ray photoelectron spectroscopy (XPS)
- X-ray diffraction (XRD)
- X-ray fluorescence spectroscopy (XRF)
- X-ray microscopy (XRM)
- X-ray reflectivity (XRR)

== See also ==
- Analytical chemistry
- List of materials analysis methods
