= Blank (solution) =

Solution containing little to no analyte of interest

A blank solution is a solution containing little to no analyte of interest, usually used to calibrate instruments such as a colorimeter. According to the EPA, the "primary purpose of blanks is to trace sources of artificially introduced contamination." Different types of blanks are used to identify the source of contamination in the sample. The types of blanks include equipment blank, field blank, trip blank, method blank, and instrument blank.
