= Quality of analytical results =

Quality of measurements made in chemistry and other areas is an important issue in today's world as measurements influence quality of life, cross-border trade and commerce. In this respect, EN ISO 17025 is the main standard used by testing and calibration laboratories as to appropriately tackle quality management related issues. While chapter four of the standard deals with management requirements, chapter five describes requirements for technical competence. Management related issues can be found in other standards as well e.g. ISO 9000, however the technical requirements are specific for calibration and testing laboratories.

== Technical requirements ==
As for technical competence, the following topics are especially important:

- sampling
- traceability of measurement result
- validation of measurement procedure
- measurement uncertainty
- participation in interlaboratory comparisons
- internal quality control.

As it is important to have globally harmonised approach to the above-mentioned topics, various training and teaching material have been developed at the European level, as to support implementation e.g. by EURACHEM and by TrainMiC.

== See also ==
- Analytical chemistry
- Metrology
