= Vacuum fusion =

Vacuum fusion is an analytical chemistry technique, used for determining the oxygen, hydrogen, and sometimes nitrogen content of metals. While ineffective when used on alkali or earth metals, vacuum fusion remains a viable means when applied to almost all other metals.
