= Standard addition =

Method in analytical chemistry

The standard addition method, also called known addition, often used in analytical chemistry, quantifies the analyte present in an unknown. This method is useful for analyzing complex samples where a matrix effect interferes with the analyte signal. In comparison to the calibration curve method, the standard addition method has the advantage of the matrices of the unknown and standards being nearly identical. This minimizes the potential bias arising from the matrix effect when determining the concentration.

== Variations ==
Standard addition involves adding known amounts of analyte to an unknown sample, a process known as spiking. By increasing the number of spikes, the analyst can extrapolate for the analyte concentration in the unknown that has not been spiked. There are multiple approaches to the standard addition. The following section summarizes each approach.

=== Single standard addition used in polarography ===
In classic polarography, the standard addition method involves creating two samples – one sample without any spikes, and another one with spikes. By comparing the current measured from two samples, the amount of analyte in the unknown is determined. This approach was the first reported use of standard addition, and was introduced by a German mining chemist, Hans Hohn, in 1937. In his polarography practical book, titled Chemische Analysen mit dem Polargraphen, Hohn referred this method as Eichzusatz, which translates to "calibration addition" in English. Later in the German literature, this method was called as Standardzugabe, meaning "standard addition" in English.

Modern polarography typically involves using three solutions: the standard solution, the unknown solution, and a mixture of the standard and unknown solution. By measuring any two of these solutions, the unknown concentration is calculated.

As polarographic standard addition involves using only one solution with the standard added – the two-level design, polarographers always refer to the method as singular, standard addition.

=== Successive addition of standards in constant sample and total volume ===
Outside the field of polarography, Harvey's book Spectrochemical Procedures was the next earliest reference book to mention standard addition. Harvey's approach, which involves the successive addition of standards, closely resembles the most commonly used method of standard addition today.

To apply this method, analysts prepare multiple solutions containing equal amounts of unknown and spike them with varying concentrations of the analyte. The amount of unknown and the total volume are the same across the standards and the only difference between the standards is the amount of analyte spiked. This leads to a linear relationship between the analyte signal and the amount of analyte added, allowing for the determination of the unknown's concentration by extrapolating the zero analyte signal. One disadvantage of this approach is that it requires sufficient amount of the unknown. When working with limiting amount of sample, an analyst might need to make a single addition, but it is generally considered a best practice to make at least two additions whenever possible.

Note that this is not limited to liquid samples. In atomic absorption spectroscopy, for example, standard additions are often used with solid as the sample.

In atomic emission spectroscopy, background signal cannot be resolved by standard addition. Thus, background signal must be subtracted from the unknown and standard intensities prior to extrapolating for the zero signal.

As this approach involves varying amount of standards added, it is often referred in the plural form as standard additions.

== Example ==
Suppose an analyst is determining the concentration of silver in samples of waste solution in photographic film by atomic absorption spectroscopy. Using the calibration curve method, the analyst can calibrate the spectrometer with a pure silver aqueous solutions, and use the calibration graph to determine the amount of silver present in the waste samples. This method, however, assumes the pure aqueous solution of silver and a photographic waste sample have the same matrix and therefore the waste samples are free of matrix effect.

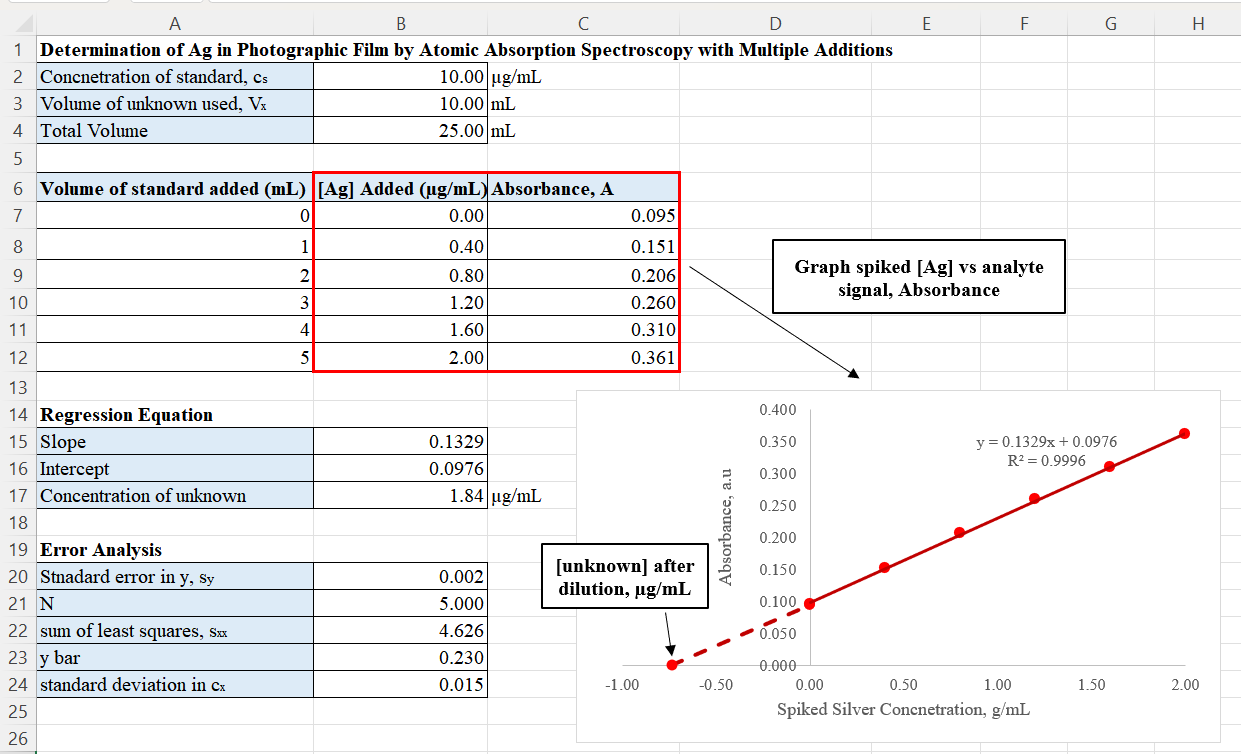
Spreadsheet for standard addition example on determining the silver concentration of photographic film waste. Please refer to the Limitation and Uncertainty of Standard Addition section for more information on how to calculate for the Error Analysis portion. The silver concentration in the test sample is the x-intercept of the plot. The dilution factor is multiplied by this initial concentration to determine the original concentration.

Matrix effects occur even with methods such as plasma spectrometry, which have a reputation for being relatively free from interferences. As such, analyst would use standard additions in this case.

For standard additions, equal volumes of the sample solutions are taken, and all are separately spiked with varying amounts of the analyte – 0, 1, 2, 3, 4, 5 mL, where 0 mL addition is a pure test sample solution. All solutions are then diluted to the same volume of 25 mL, by using the same solvent as the one used to prepare the spiking solutions. Each prepared solution is then analyzed using an atomic absorption spectrometer. The resulting signals and corresponding spiked silver concentrations are plotted, with concentration on the x-axis and the signal on the y-axis. A regression line is calculated through least squares analysis and the x-intercept of the line is determined by the ratio of the y-intercept and the slope of the regression line. This x-intercept represents the silver concentration of the test sample where there is no standard solution added.

== Error ==
While the standard addition method is effective in reducing the interference of most matrix effects on the analyte signal, it cannot correct for the translational matrix effects. These effects are caused by other substances present in the unknown sample that are often independent of the analyte concentration. They are commonly referred to as 'background' and can impact the intercept of the regression line without affecting the slope. This results in bias towards the unknown concentration. In other words, standard addition will not correct for these backgrounds or other spectral interferences.

Analysts also needs to evaluate the precision of the determined unknown concentration by calculating for the standard deviation, $s_x$. Lower $s_x$ indicates greater precision of the measurements. The value of $s_x$ is given by

$$s_x=\frac{s_y}{|m|}\sqrt{\frac{1}{n}+\frac{\bar{y}^2}{m^2\sum{(x_i-\bar{x})^2}}}$$

where the calculation involves the following variables:

- standard deviation of the residuals, $s_y$ $=\sqrt{\frac{\sum{(y_i-mx_i-b)}^2}{n-2}}$
- absolute value of the slope of the least-squares line, $m$
- y-intercept of the linear curve, $b$
- number of standards, $n$
- average measurement of the standards, $\bar{y}$
- concentrations of the standards, $x_i$
- average concentration of the standards, $\bar{x}$

== See also ==
- Standard curve
- Isotope dilution
- Internal standard
