= Matrix (chemical analysis) =

Components of a chemical sample other than the substance of interest

In chemical analysis, matrix refers to the components of a sample other than the analyte of interest. The matrix can have a considerable effect on the way the analysis is conducted and the quality of the results obtained; such effects are called matrix effects. For example, the ionic strength of the solution can have an effect on the activity coefficients of the analytes. The most common approach for accounting for matrix effects is to build a calibration curve using standard samples with known analyte concentration and which try to approximate the matrix of the sample as much as possible. This is especially important for solid samples where there is a strong matrix influence. In cases with complex or unknown matrices, the standard addition method can be used. In this technique, the response of the sample is measured and recorded, for example, using an electrode selective for the analyte. Then, a small volume of standard solution is added and the response is measured again. Ideally, the standard addition should increase the analyte concentration by a factor of 1.5 to 3, and several additions should be averaged. The volume of standard solution should be small enough to disturb the matrix as little as possible.

== Matrix effect ==
Matrix enhancement and suppression is frequently observed in modern analytical routines, such as GC, HPLC, and ICP.

Matrix effect is quantitated by the use of the following formula:

$$ME = 100  \left ( \frac{A (extract)}{A (standard)} \right )$$

where

A(extract) is the peak area of analyte, when diluted with matrix extract.

A(standard) is the peak area of analyte in the absence of matrix.

The concentration of analyte in both standards should be the same. A matrix effect value close to 100 indicates absence of matrix influence. A matrix effect value of less than 100 indicates suppression, while a value larger than 100 is a sign of matrix enhancement.

An alternative definition of matrix effect utilizes the formula:

$$ME = 100  \left ( \frac{A (extract)}{A (standard)} \right ) - 100$$

The advantages of this definition are that negative values indicates suppression, while positive values are a sign of matrix enhancement. Ideally, a value of 0 is related to the absence of matrix effect.

== See also ==
- Extraction (chemistry)
