= Analytical chemistry =

Study of the separation, identification, and quantification of matter

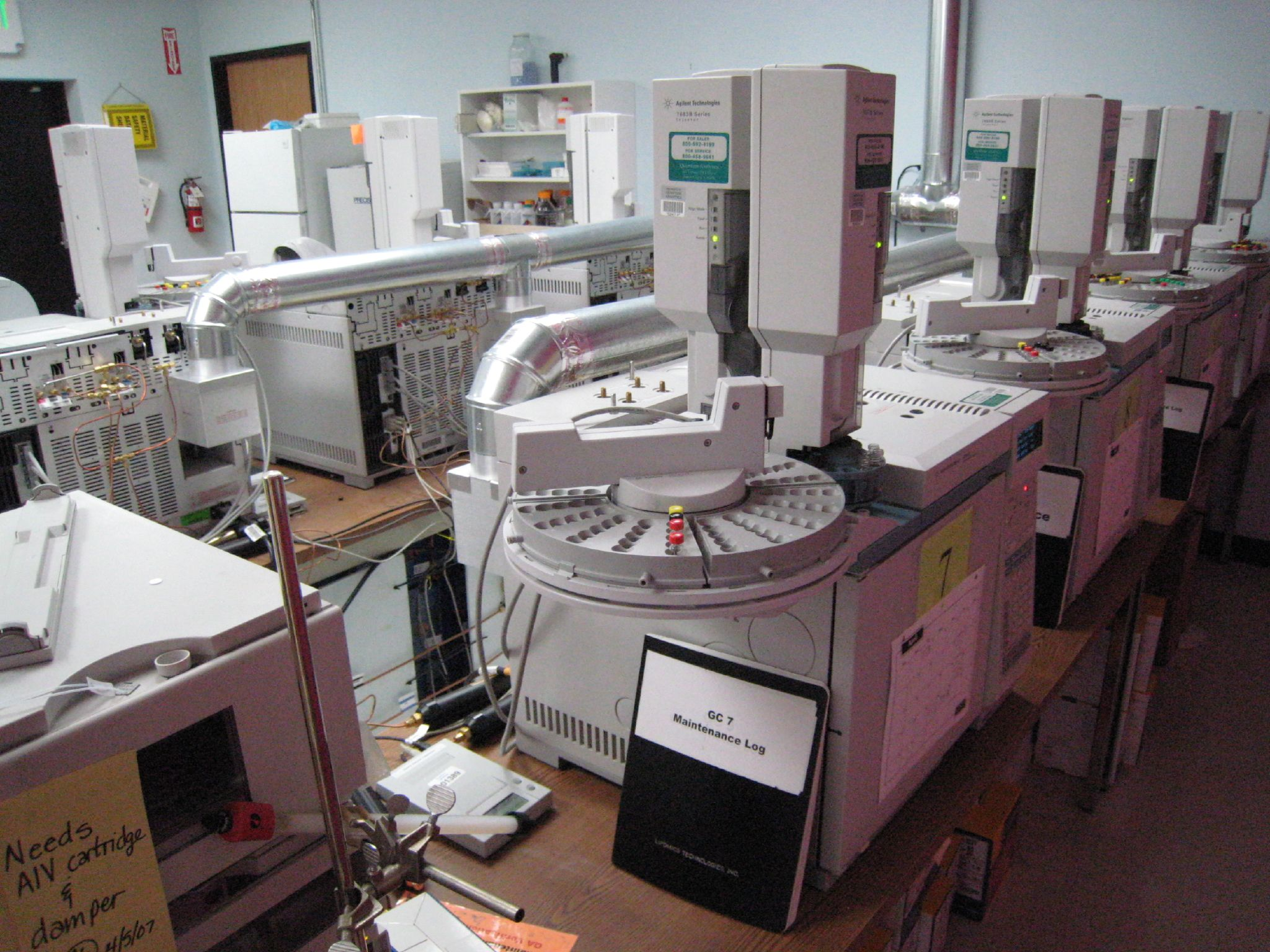
Gas chromatography laboratory

Analytical chemistry (or chemical analysis) is the branch of chemistry concerned with the development and application of methods to identify the chemical composition of materials and quantify the amounts of components in mixtures. It focuses on methods to identify unknown compounds, possibly in a mixture or solution, and quantify a compound's presence in terms of amount of substance (in any phase), concentration (in aqueous or solution phase), percentage by mass or number of moles in a mixture of compounds (or partial pressure in the case of gas phase).

It encompasses both classical techniques (e.g. titration, gravimetric analysis) and modern instrumental approaches (e.g. spectroscopy, chromatography, mass spectrometry, electrochemical methods). Modern analytical chemistry is deeply intertwined with data analysis and chemometrics, and is increasingly shaped by trends such as automation, miniaturization, and real-time sensing, with applications across fields as diverse as biochemistry, medicinal chemistry, forensic science, archaeology, nutritional science, agricultural chemistry, chemical synthesis, metallurgy, chemical engineering and materials science.

In the age of "big data", analytical chemistry, along with chemometrics and bioinformatics, has become central to interpreting complex results from high-throughput techniques like gas chromatography-mass spectrometry (GCMS), high-performance liquid chromatography, inductively coupled plasma mass spectrometry, and high-resolution mass spectrometry. There is also a strong trend towards miniaturization, automation, and the development of real-time, point-of-care diagnostic sensors.

== History ==
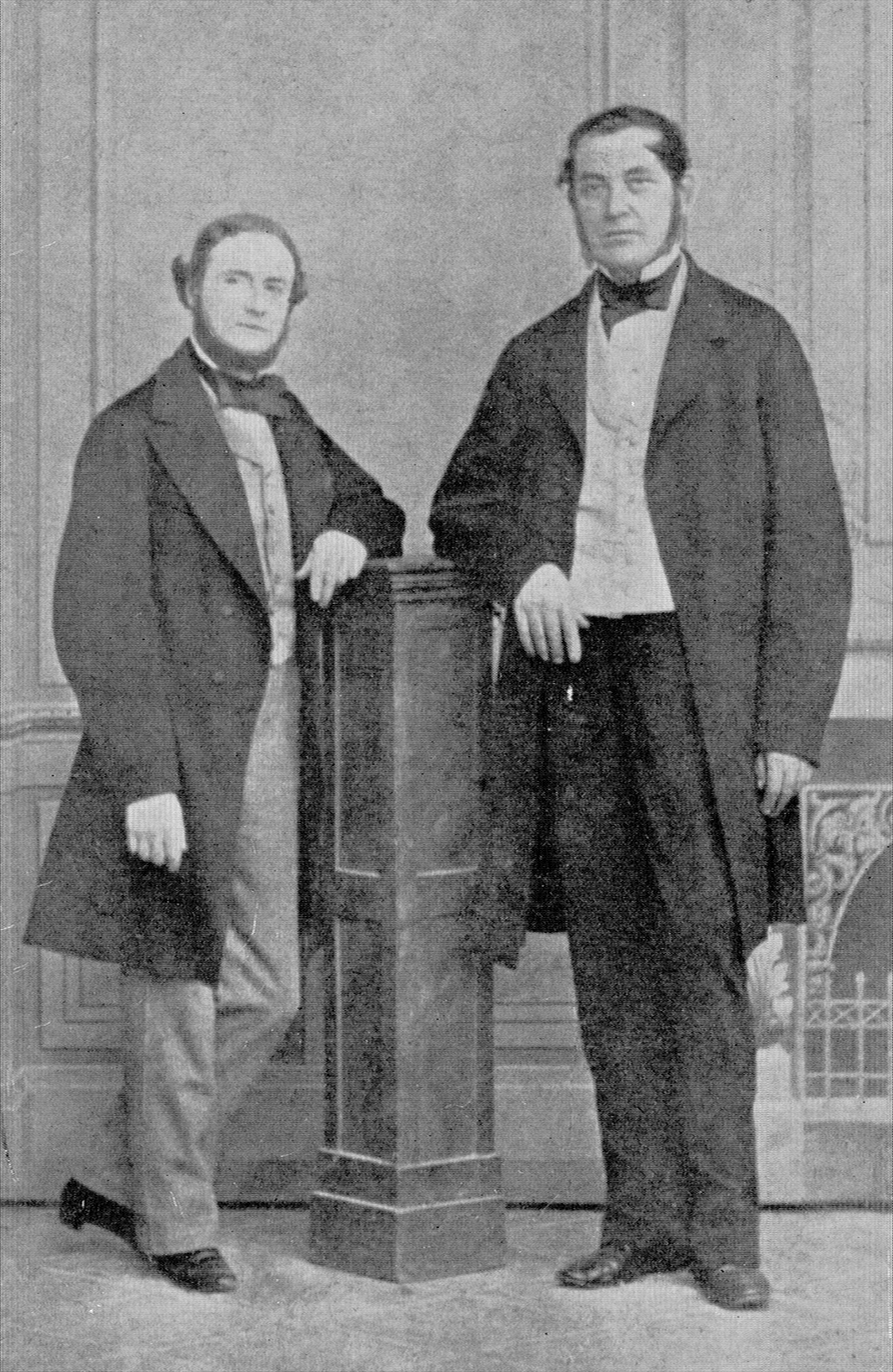
Gustav Kirchhoff (left) and Robert Bunsen (right)

Analytical chemistry has been important since the early days of chemistry, providing methods for determining which elements and chemicals are present in the object in question. During this period, significant contributions to analytical chemistry included the development of systematic elemental analysis by Justus von Liebig and systematized organic analysis based on the specific reactions of functional groups.

The first instrumental analysis was flame emissive spectrometry, developed by Robert Bunsen and Gustav Kirchhoff, who discovered rubidium (Rb) and caesium (Cs) in 1860.

Most of the major developments in analytical chemistry took place after 1900. During this period, instrumental analysis became progressively dominant in the field. In particular, many of the basic spectroscopic and spectrometric techniques were discovered in the early 20th century and refined in the late 20th century.

The separation sciences follow a similar timeline of development and have also become increasingly transformed into high-performance instruments. In the 1970s many of these techniques began to be used together as hybrid techniques to achieve a complete characterization of samples.

Starting in the 1970s, analytical chemistry became progressively more inclusive of biological questions (bioanalytical chemistry), whereas it had previously been largely focused on inorganic or small organic molecules. Lasers have been increasingly used as probes and even to initiate and influence a wide variety of reactions. The late 20th century also saw an expansion of the application of analytical chemistry from somewhat academic chemical questions to forensic, environmental, industrial and medical questions, such as in histology.

Modern analytical chemistry is dominated by instrumental analysis. Many analytical chemists focus on a single type of instrument. Academics tend to either focus on new applications and discoveries or on new methods of analysis. The discovery of a chemical present in blood that increases the risk of cancer would be a discovery that an analytical chemist might be involved in. An effort to develop a new method might involve the use of a tunable laser to increase the specificity and sensitivity of a spectrometric method. Many methods, once developed, are kept purposely static so that data can be compared over long periods of time. This is particularly true in industrial quality assurance (QA), forensic, and environmental applications. Analytical chemistry plays an increasingly important role in the pharmaceutical industry where, aside from QA, it is used in the discovery of new drug candidates and in clinical applications where understanding the interactions between the drug and the patient are critical.

The 21st century has been defined by the digitalization of analytical chemistry. The handling of large datasets ("big data") from instruments like Orbitrap mass spectrometers has made advanced data analysis, including machine learning, an essential skill. This era also focuses strongly on sustainability, leading to the green chemistry subfield of Green Analytical Chemistry, which aims to minimize the environmental impact of chemical analyses.

== Classical methods ==
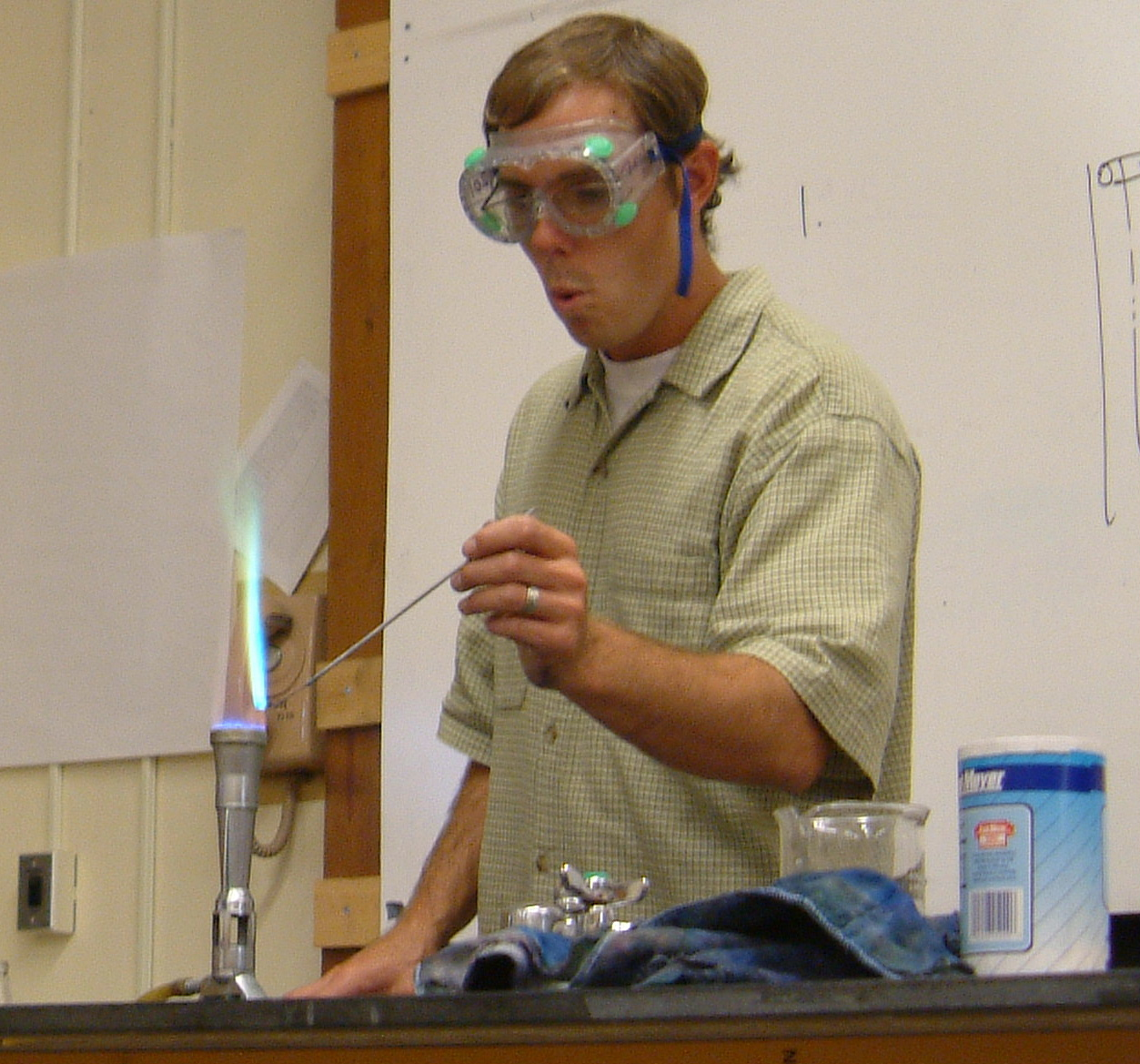
The presence of copper in this qualitative analysis is indicated by the bluish-green color of the flame.

Although modern analytical chemistry is dominated by sophisticated instrumentation, the roots of analytical chemistry and some of the principles used in modern instruments are from traditional techniques, many of which are still used today. These techniques also tend to form the backbone of most undergraduate analytical chemistry educational labs.

=== Qualitative analysis ===
==== Chemical tests ====
There are numerous qualitative chemical tests; examples include the acid test for gold and the Kastle-Meyer test for the presence of blood.

==== Flame test ====
Inorganic qualitative analysis generally refers to a systematic scheme to confirm the presence of certain aqueous ions or elements by performing a series of reactions that eliminate a range of possibilities and then confirm suspected ions with a confirming test. Sometimes small carbon-containing ions are included in such schemes. With modern instrumentation, these tests are rarely used but can be useful for educational purposes and in fieldwork or other situations where access to state-of-the-art instruments is not available or expedient.

=== Quantitative analysis ===
Quantitative analysis is the measurement of the quantities of particular chemical constituents present in a substance. Quantities can be measured by mass (gravimetric analysis) or volume (volumetric analysis).

==== Gravimetric analysis ====
Gravimetric analysis involves determining the amount of material present by weighing the sample before and/or after some transformation. A common example used in undergraduate education is the determination of the amount of water in a hydrate by heating the sample to remove the water such that the difference in weight is due to the loss of water.

==== Volumetric analysis ====
Titration involves the gradual addition of a measurable reactant to an exact volume of a solution being analyzed until some equivalence point is reached. Titration is a family of techniques used to determine the concentration of an analyte. Titrating accurately to either the half-equivalence point or the endpoint of a titration allows the chemist to determine the amount of moles used, which can then be used to determine a concentration or composition of the titrant. Most familiar to those who have taken chemistry during secondary education is the acid-base titration involving a color-changing pH indicator, such as phenolphthalein. There are many other types of titrations, including potentiometric titrations and precipitation titrations. Chemists might also create titration curves by systematically testing the pH after every added drop in order to understand different properties of the titrant.

== Instrumental methods ==
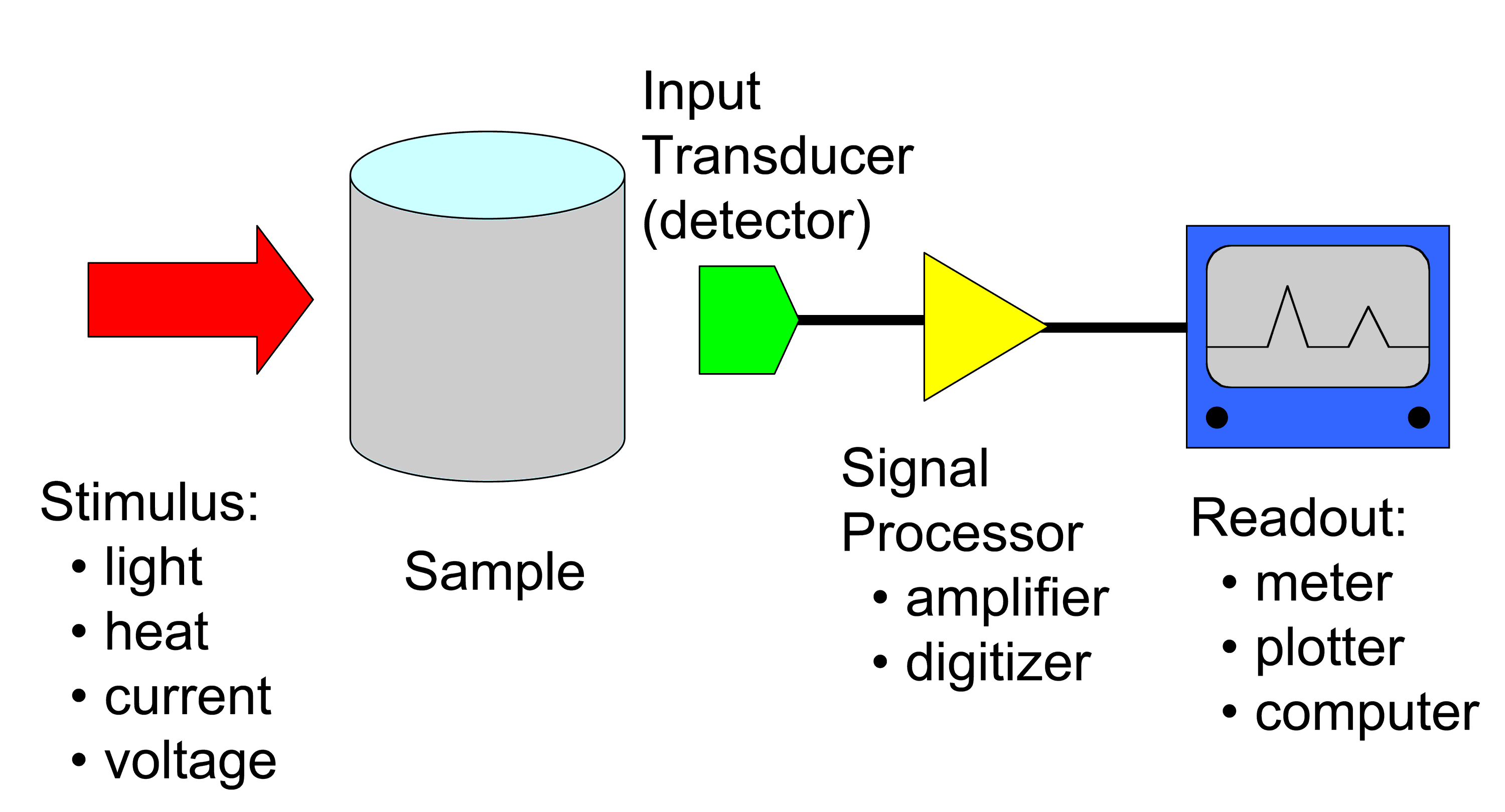
Block diagram of an analytical instrument showing the stimulus and measurement of response

=== Spectroscopy ===
Spectroscopy measures the interaction of the molecules with electromagnetic radiation. Spectroscopy consists of many different applications such as time-resolved raman spectroscopy, atomic absorption spectroscopy, atomic emission spectroscopy, ultraviolet-visible spectroscopy, X-ray spectroscopy, fluorescence spectroscopy, infrared spectroscopy, Raman spectroscopy, dual polarization interferometry, nuclear magnetic resonance spectroscopy, photoemission spectroscopy, Mössbauer spectroscopy and so on.

=== Mass spectrometry ===
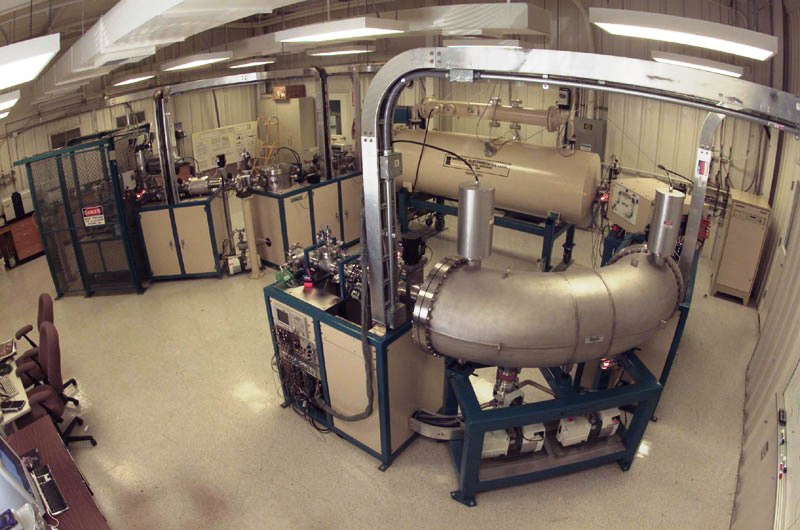
An accelerator mass spectrometer used for radiocarbon dating and other analysis

Mass spectrometry measures mass-to-charge ratio of molecules using electric and magnetic fields. In a mass spectrometer, a small amount of sample is ionized and converted to gaseous ions, where they are separated and analyzed according to their mass-to-charge ratios.

There are several ionization methods: electron ionization, chemical ionization, electrospray ionization, fast atom bombardment, matrix-assisted laser desorption/ionization, and others. Also, mass spectrometry is categorized by approaches of mass analyzers: magnetic-sector, quadrupole mass analyzer, quadrupole ion trap, time-of-flight, Fourier transform ion cyclotron resonance, and so on.

=== Electrochemical analysis ===
Electroanalytical methods measure the potential (volts) and/or current (amps) in an electrochemical cell containing the analyte. These methods can be categorized according to which aspects of the cell are controlled and which are measured. The four main categories are potentiometry (the difference in electrode potentials is measured), coulometry (the transferred charge is measured over time), amperometry (the cell's current is measured over time), and voltammetry (the cell's current is measured while actively altering the cell's potential).

=== Thermal analysis ===
Calorimetry and thermogravimetric analysis measure the interaction of a material and heat.

=== Separation ===
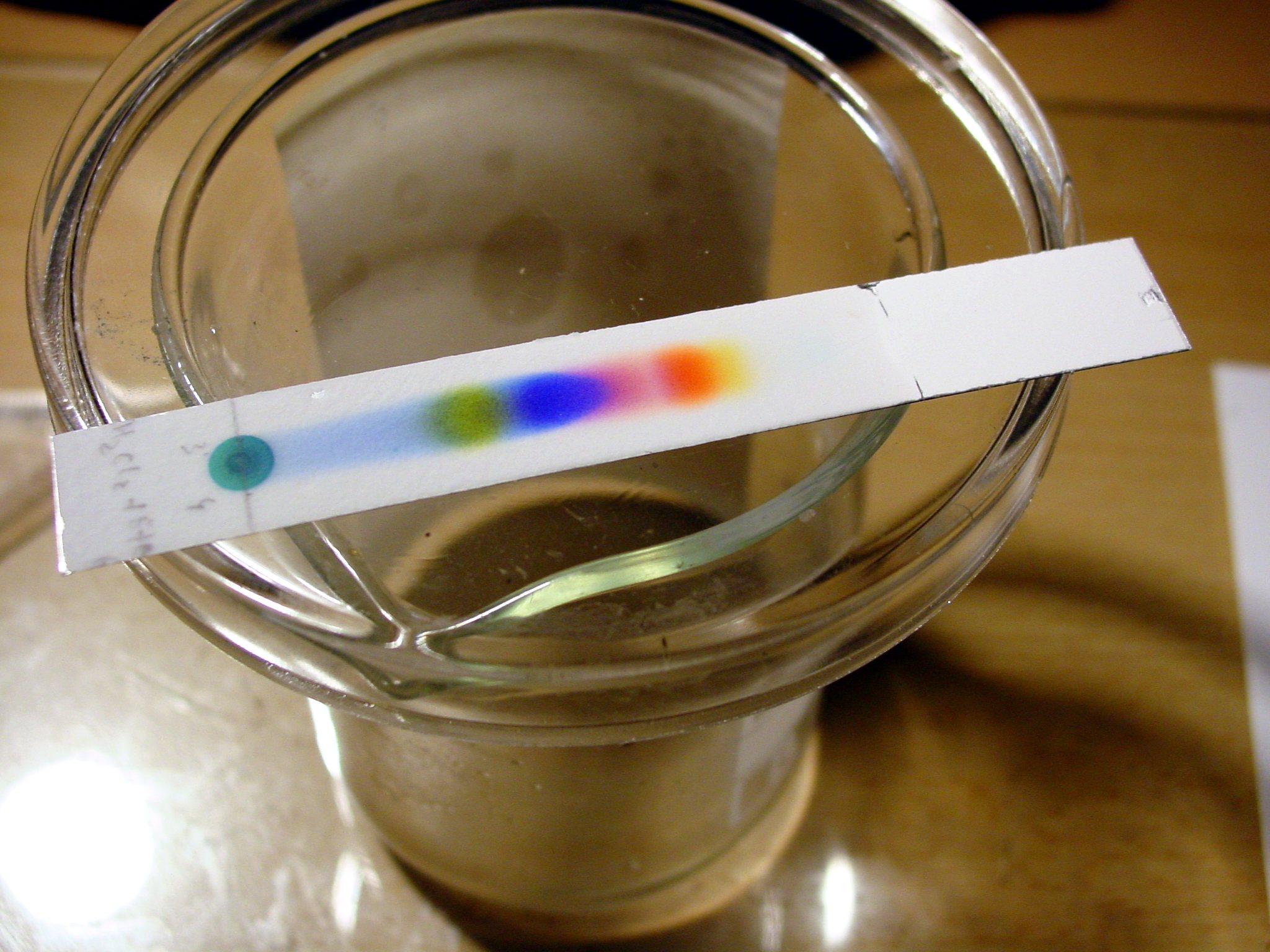
Separation of black ink on a thin-layer chromatography plate

Separation processes are used to decrease the complexity of material mixtures. Chromatography, electrophoresis and field flow fractionation are representative of this field.

==== Chromatographic assays ====
Chromatography can be used to determine the presence of substances in a sample, as different components in a mixture have different tendencies to adsorb onto the stationary phase or dissolve in the mobile phase. Thus, different components of the mixture move at different speeds. Different components of a mixture can therefore be identified by their respective R_{ƒ} values, which is the ratio between the migration distance of the substance and the migration distance of the solvent front during chromatography.

In combination with the instrumental methods, chromatography can be used in the quantitative determination of substances. There are different types of chromatography that differ from the media they use to separate the analyte and the sample. In thin-layer chromatography, the analyte mixture moves up and separates along the coated sheet under the volatile mobile phase. In gas chromatography, the gas phase separates the volatile analytes. A common method of chromatography using liquid as a mobile phase is high-performance liquid chromatography.

=== Hybrid techniques ===
Combinations of the above techniques produce a "hybrid" or "hyphenated" technique. Several examples are in popular use today and new hybrid techniques are under development. For example, gas chromatography-mass spectrometry, gas chromatography-infrared spectroscopy, liquid chromatography-mass spectrometry, liquid chromatography-NMR spectroscopy, liquid chromatography-infrared spectroscopy, and capillary electrophoresis-mass spectrometry.

Hyphenated separation techniques refer to a combination of two (or more) techniques to detect and separate chemicals from solutions. Most often the other technique is some form of chromatography. Hyphenated techniques are widely used in chemistry and biochemistry. A slash is sometimes used instead of hyphen, especially if the name of one of the methods contains a hyphen itself.

=== Microscopy ===
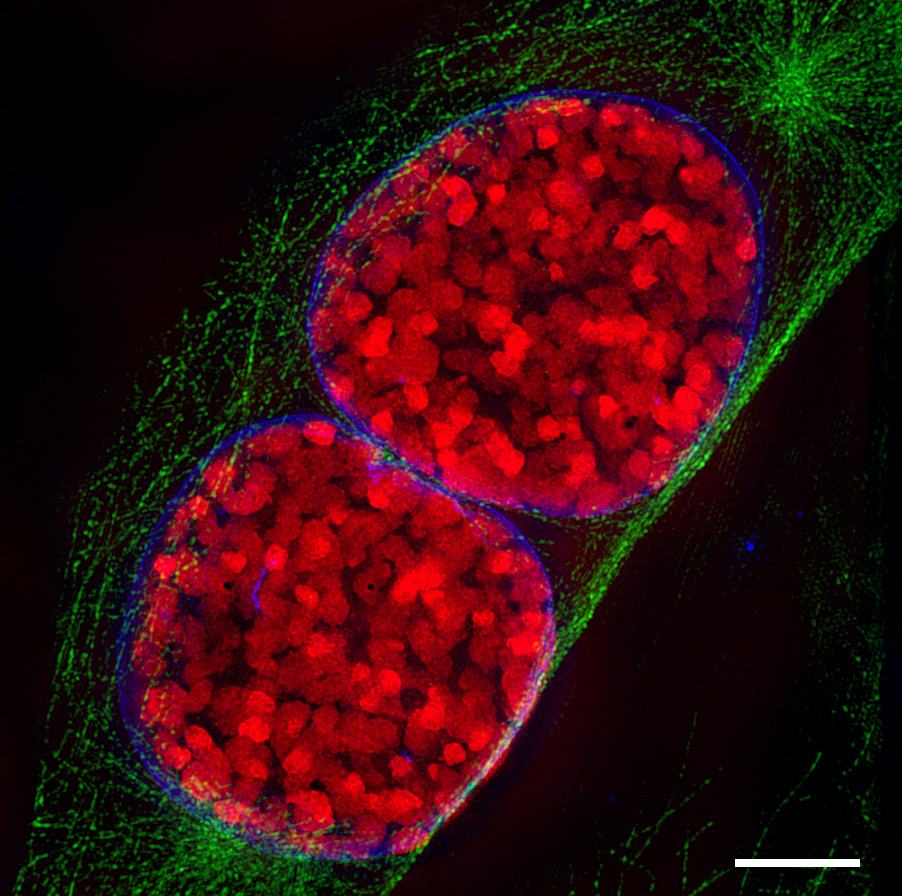
Fluorescence microscope image of two mouse cell nuclei in prophase (scale bar is 5 μm)

The visualization of single molecules, single cells, biological tissues, and nanomaterials is an important and attractive approach in analytical science. Also, hybridization with other traditional analytical tools is revolutionizing analytical science. Microscopy can be categorized into three different fields: optical microscopy, electron microscopy, and scanning probe microscopy. Recently, this field is rapidly progressing because of the rapid development of the computer and camera industries.

=== Lab-on-a-chip ===
Devices that integrate (multiple) laboratory functions on a single chip of only millimeters to a few square centimeters in size and that are capable of handling extremely small fluid volumes down to less than picoliters.

== Data analysis and chemometrics ==
The vast amount of data produced by modern analytical instruments has made computational data analysis an integral part of the field. The field of chemometrics uses statistical and mathematical methods to design optimal experimental procedures and to extract meaningful information from chemical data.

Key areas include:

- Multivariate calibration: Used to develop models that correlate instrument responses (e.g., spectra) to analyte concentrations, essential in techniques like near-infrared spectroscopy.
- Pattern recognition: Employed to classify samples based on their analytical profile, with applications in food authenticity and medical diagnostics.
- Machine learning and artificial intelligence: These techniques are increasingly used for predictive modeling, optimizing analytical methods, and automating data interpretation.

== Errors ==
Error can be defined as numerical difference between observed value and true value. The experimental error can be divided into two types, systematic error and random error. Systematic error results from a flaw in equipment or the design of an experiment while random error results from uncontrolled or uncontrollable variables in the experiment.

In error the true value and observed value in chemical analysis can be related to each other by the equation

$$\varepsilon_{\rm a} = |x - \bar{x}|$$

where

- $\varepsilon_{\rm a}$ is the absolute error.
- $x$ is the true value.
- $\bar{x}$ is the observed value.

An error of a measurement is an inverse measure of accurate measurement (i.e., smaller the error greater the accuracy of the measurement).

Errors can be expressed relatively. Given the relative error ($\varepsilon_{\rm r}$):

$$\varepsilon_{\rm r} = \frac{\varepsilon_{\rm a}}{|x|} = \left | \frac{x - \bar{x}}{x} \right |$$

The percent error can also be calculated:

$$\varepsilon_{\rm r} \times 100\%$$

To use these values in a function, it may be useful to calculate the error of the function. If $f$ is a function with $N$ variables, the propagation of uncertainty must be calculated in order to know the error in $f$:

$$\varepsilon_{\rm a} (f) \approx  \sum_{i = 1}^N \left | \frac{\partial f}{\partial x_i} \right | \varepsilon_{\rm a}(x_i) = \left | \frac{\partial f}{\partial x_1} \right | \varepsilon_{\rm a}(x_1) + \left | \frac{\partial f}{\partial x_2} \right | \varepsilon_{\rm a}(x_2) + \ldots + \left | \frac{\partial f}{\partial x_N} \right | \varepsilon_{\rm a}(x_N)$$

== Standards ==
=== Standard curve ===
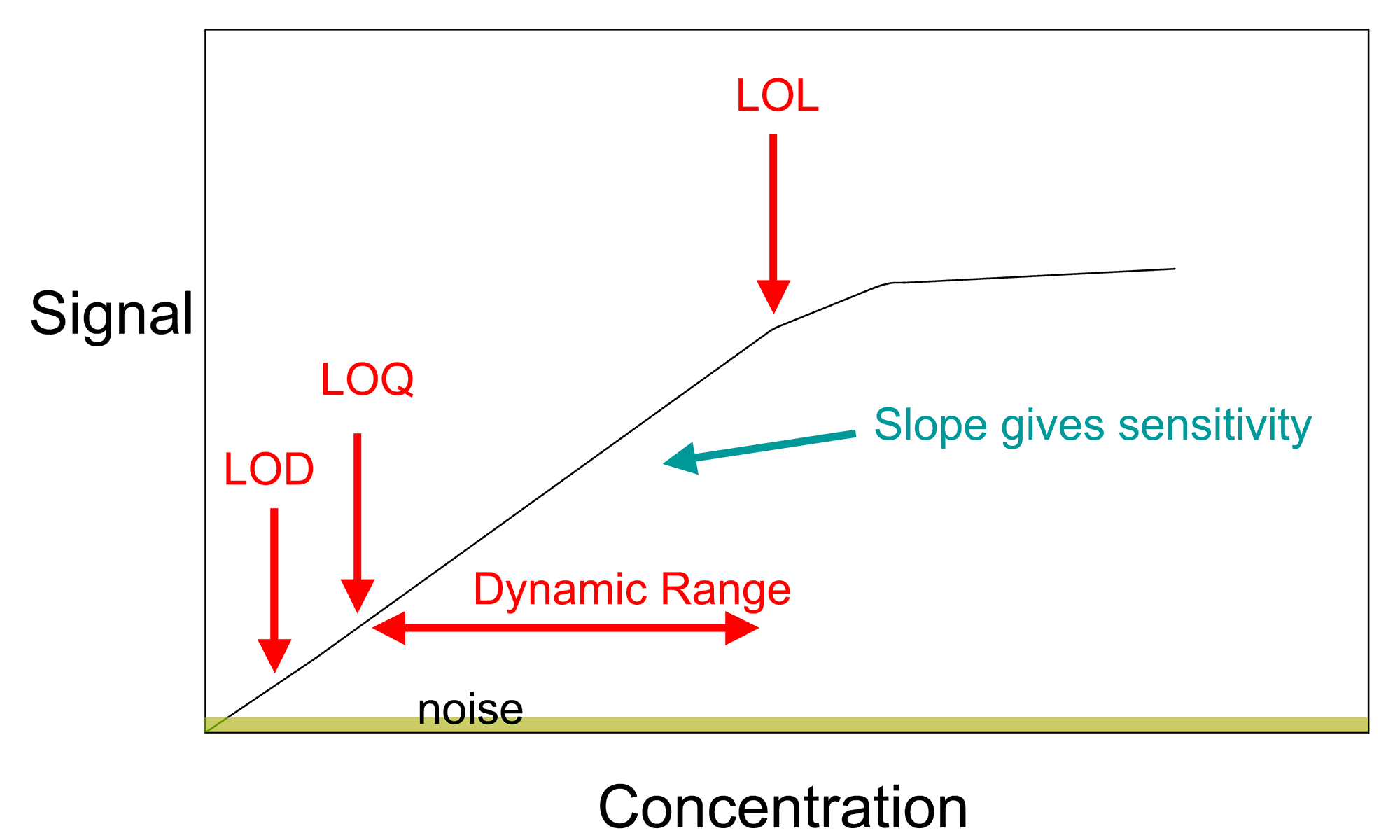
A calibration curve plot showing limit of detection (LOD), limit of quantification (LOQ), dynamic range, and limit of linearity (LOL)

A general method for analysis of concentration involves the creation of a calibration curve. This allows for the determination of the amount of a chemical in a material by comparing the results of an unknown sample to those of a series of known standards. If the concentration of an element or compound in a sample exceeds the detection range of the technique, it can simply be diluted in a pure solvent. If the amount in the sample is below an instrument's range of measurement, the method of addition can be used. In this method, a known quantity of the element or compound under study is added, and the difference between the concentration added and the concentration observed is the amount actually in the sample.

=== Internal standards ===
Sometimes an internal standard is added at a known concentration directly to an analytical sample to aid in quantitation. The amount of analyte present is then determined relative to the internal standard as a calibrant. An ideal internal standard is an isotopically enriched analyte which gives rise to the method of isotope dilution.

=== Standard addition ===
The method of standard addition is used in instrumental analysis to determine the concentration of a substance (analyte) in an unknown sample by comparison to a set of samples of known concentration, similar to using a calibration curve. Standard addition can be applied to most analytical techniques and is used instead of a calibration curve to solve the matrix effect problem.

== Signals and noise ==
One of the most important components of analytical chemistry is maximizing the desired signal while minimizing the associated noise. The analytical figure of merit is known as the signal-to-noise ratio (S/N or SNR).

Noise can arise from environmental factors as well as from fundamental physical processes.

=== Thermal noise ===
Thermal noise results from the motion of charge carriers (usually electrons) in an electrical circuit generated by their thermal motion. Thermal noise is white noise, meaning that the power spectral density is constant throughout the frequency spectrum.

The root mean square value of the thermal noise in a resistor is given by

$$v_{\rm RMS} = \sqrt { 4 k_{\rm B} T R \Delta f },$$

where k_{B} is the Boltzmann constant, T is the temperature, R is the resistance, and $\Delta f$ is the bandwidth of the frequency $f$.

=== Shot noise ===
Shot noise is a type of electronic noise that occurs when the finite number of particles (such as electrons in an electronic circuit or photons in an optical device) is small enough to give rise to statistical fluctuations in a signal.

Shot noise is a Poisson process, and the charge carriers that make up the current follow a Poisson distribution. The root mean square current fluctuation is given by

$$i_{\rm RMS} = \sqrt{2 e I\Delta f}$$

where e is the elementary charge and I is the average current. Shot noise is white noise.

=== Flicker noise ===
Flicker noise is electronic noise with a 1/ƒ frequency spectrum; as f increases, the noise decreases. Flicker noise arises from a variety of sources, such as impurities in a conductive channel, generation, and recombination noise in a transistor due to base current, and so on. This noise can be avoided by modulation of the signal at a higher frequency, for example, through the use of a lock-in amplifier.

=== Environmental noise ===
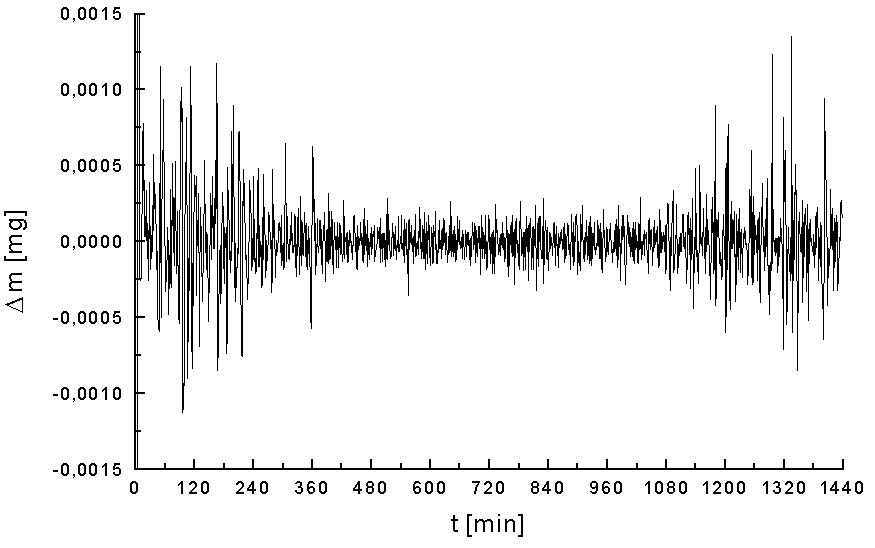
Noise in a thermogravimetric analysis; lower noise in the middle of the plot results from less human activity (and environmental noise) at night

Environmental noise arises from the surroundings of the analytical instrument. Sources of electromagnetic noise are power lines, radio and television stations, wireless devices, compact fluorescent lamps and electric motors. Many of these noise sources are narrow bandwidth and, therefore, can be avoided. Temperature and vibration isolation may be required for some instruments.

=== Noise reduction ===
Noise reduction can be accomplished either in computer hardware or software. Examples of hardware noise reduction are the use of shielded cable, analog filtering, and signal modulation. Examples of software noise reduction are digital filtering, ensemble average, boxcar average, and correlation methods.

== Applications ==
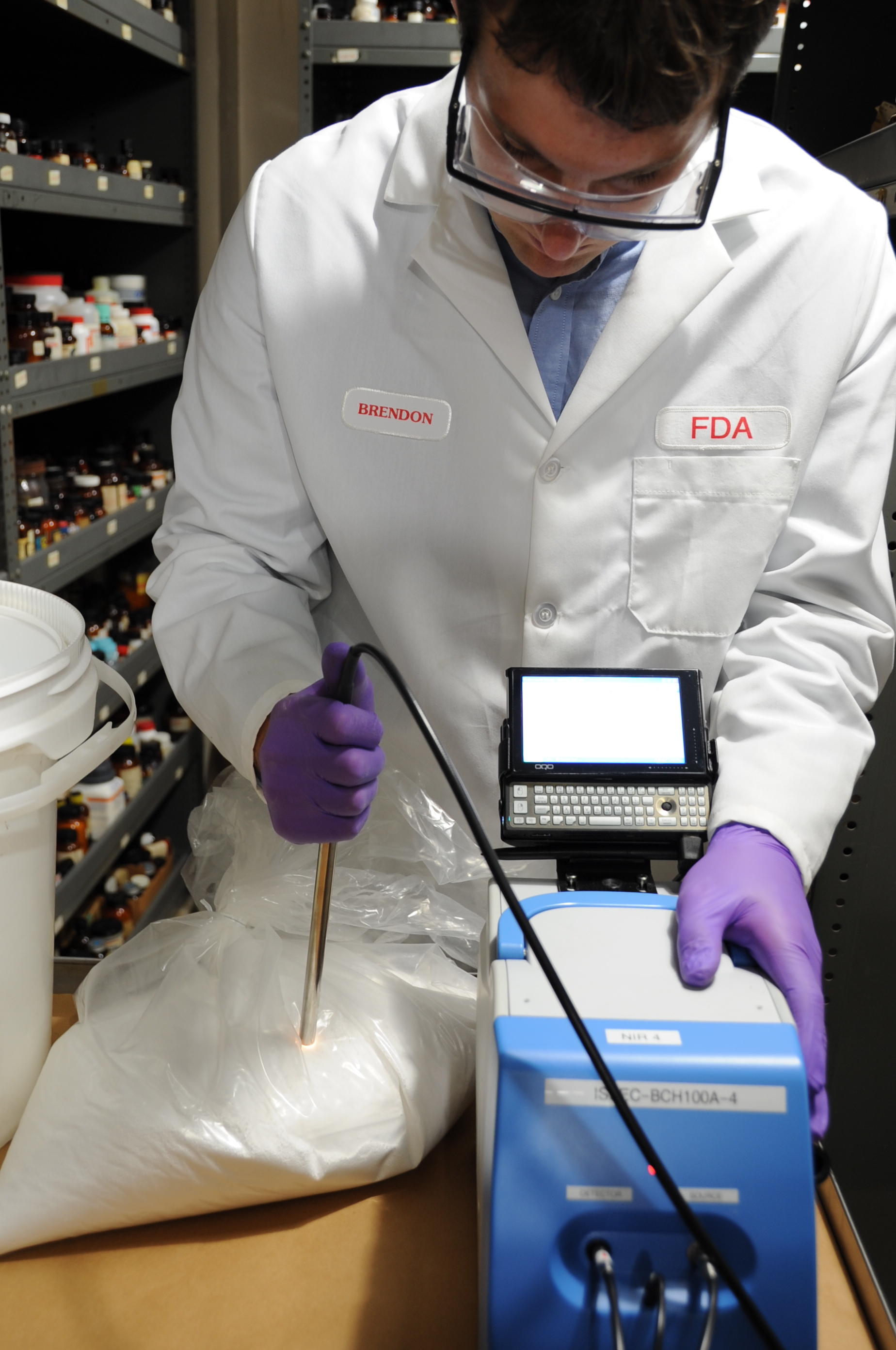
A U.S. Food and Drug Administration scientist uses a portable near-infrared spectroscopy device to inspect lactose for adulteration with melamine

Analytical chemistry has applications across science and industry. It is fundamental to forensic science (e.g., DNA fingerprinting and toxicology), bioanalysis (e.g., measuring drug concentrations in pharmacokinetic studies), clinical analysis (e.g., blood glucose monitoring and COVID-19 PCR testing), environmental monitoring (e.g., testing for pollutants in water and air), and materials science (e.g., quality control of semiconductors and nanomaterials).

Great effort is being put into shrinking the analysis techniques to chip size. Although few examples of such systems compete with traditional analysis techniques, potential advantages include size/portability, speed, and cost. Micro total analysis system (μTAS) or lab-on-a-chip. Microscale chemistry reduces the amount of chemicals used.

Many developments improve the analysis of biological systems. Examples of rapidly expanding fields in this area are genomics, DNA sequencing and related research in genetic fingerprinting and DNA microarray; proteomics, the analysis of protein concentrations and modifications, especially in response to various stressors, at various developmental stages, or in various parts of the body; metabolomics, which deals with metabolites; transcriptomics, including mRNA and associated fields; lipidomics, dealing with lipids and its related fields; peptidomics, dealing with peptides and its related fields; and metallomics, dealing with metal concentrations and especially with their binding to proteins and other molecules.

Analytical chemistry has played a critical role in the understanding of basic science to a variety of practical applications, such as biomedical applications, environmental monitoring, quality control of industrial manufacturing, and forensic science.

The recent developments in computer automation and information technologies have extended analytical chemistry into several new biological fields. For example, automated DNA sequencing machines were the basis for completing human genome projects, leading to the birth of genomics. Protein identification and peptide sequencing by mass spectrometry opened a new field of proteomics. In addition to automating specific processes, there is effort to automate larger sections of lab testing, such as in companies like Emerald Cloud Lab and Transcriptic.

Analytical chemistry has been an indispensable area in the development of nanotechnology. Surface characterization instruments, electron microscopes and scanning probe microscopes enable scientists to visualize atomic structures with chemical characterizations.

== See also ==
- Calorimeter
- Clinical chemistry
- Environmental chemistry
- Ion beam analysis
- List of chemical analysis methods
- Important publications in analytical chemistry
- List of materials analysis methods
- Measurement uncertainty
- Metrology
- Microanalysis
- Nuclear reaction analysis
- Quality of analytical results
- Radioanalytical chemistry
- Rutherford backscattering spectroscopy
- Sensory analysis - in the field of Food science
- Virtual instrumentation
- Working range
