= Analyte =

Chemical substance being analyzed, especially in clinical chemistry

An analyte, component (in clinical chemistry), titrand (in titrations), or chemical species is a substance or chemical constituent that is of interest in an analytical procedure. The remainder of the sample is called the matrix. The procedure of analysis measures the analyte's chemical or physical properties, thus establishing its identity or concentration in the sample.

== See also ==
- Analytical chemistry
- Standard solution
- Immunoassay
- Magnetic immunoassay
