= Nathan D. Price =

American systems biologist and researcher

Nathan Price
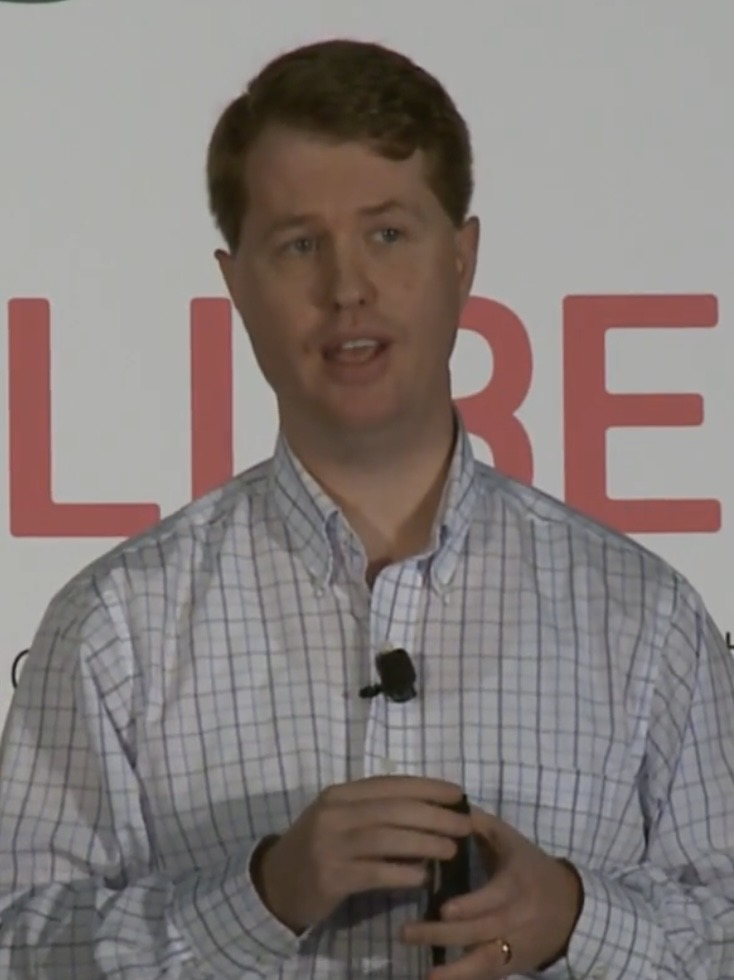
- Price in 2016
- Education: University of California, San Diego (PhD)
- Awards: Grace A. Goldsmith Award (2016); National Academy of Medicine Emerging Leader (2019); National Academy of Medicine Healthy Longevity Catalyst Award (2020); Alexander & Mildred Seelig Award (2023)
- Scientific career
- Fields: Systems biology, Bioengineering, Artificial intelligence, Precision medicine

Nathan D. Price is an American systems biologist, bioengineer, and researcher known for his work applying systems biology and artificial intelligence to human health, aging, and "scientific wellness". He is a professor and co-director of the Center for Human Healthspan at the Buck Institute for Research on Aging and affiliate faculty at the University of Washington in Bioengineering and Computer Science & Engineering. Previously, he served as a professor and associate director at the Institute for Systems Biology (ISB), where he co-directed the Hood-Price Lab for Systems Biomedicine with Leroy Hood. Currently he serves as the Chief Scientific Officer of Thorne HealthTech.

== Education and career ==
Nathan Price earned his B.S. in chemical engineering from BYU, followed by M.S. and PhD in bioengineering from the University of California, San Diego. Following his doctoral studies, he completed postdoctoral research at the Institute for Systems Biology (ISB). He later joined the faculty at ISB, becoming a professor and serving as an associate director. At ISB, he collaborated with biotechnology pioneer Leroy Hood, co-directing the Hood-Price Lab for Systems Biomedicine. He was also a co-PI of ISB’s 100K Wellness Project during his tenure. Prior to that he was an assistant professor at the University of Illinois, Urbana-Champaign in Chemical & Biomolecular Engineering and at the Institute for Genomic Biology.

Price has also been active in the commercial sector. He is the chief scientific officer at Thorne HealthTech. Prior to this role, he was the CEO of Onegevity, an AI health intelligence company that subsequently merged with Thorne. He was also a co-founder of the personalized health company Arivale.

He is an elected fellow of the American Institute for Medical and Biological Engineering and has been recognized as a Camille Dreyfus Teacher-Scholar. Price has held leadership roles in scientific bodies, including serving as chair of the National Institutes of Health (NIH) Study Section on Modeling and Analysis of Biological Systems (MABS) from 2018 to 2020, and member of National Academy of Medicine committee to review omics-based tests for clinical trials. He has also served on numerous advisory boards including for Roche (Personalized Healthcare Division), Providence St. Joseph Health, Basepaws, the Novo Nordisk Foundation Center for Biosustainability and many others. He also served on the board of trustees of the Health and Environmental Sciences Institute and the American Cancer Society (ACS) board of advisors (WA).

== Research ==
Price's research focuses on utilizing systems biology approaches, integrating large-scale biological data such as omics, and employing artificial intelligence to gain a deeper understanding of human health and the aging process, with the goal of improving both. His work is relevant to the advancement of personalized medicine, a framework emphasizing medicine that is predictive, preventive, personalized, and participatory—"P4 medicine." A central theme in his research is the concept of "scientific wellness," which advocates for the use of comprehensive, dynamic personal biological data to proactively manage individual health and mitigate disease risk.

He has authored or co-authored more than 200 peer-reviewed scientific publications in his field. In 2023, he co-authored the book The Age of Scientific Wellness: Why the Future of Medicine Is Personalized, Predictive, Data-Rich, and in Your Hands with Leroy Hood, which promotes a paradigm shift in healthcare towards proactive wellness informed by extensive personal data.

== Recognition ==
Nathan Price has received numerous honors and awards for his contributions to the fields of science and medicine. In 2019, he was selected as one of 10 Emerging Leaders in Health and Medicine by the National Academy of Medicine. He was appointed to the Board on Life Sciences of the National Academies of Sciences, Engineering, and Medicine in 2021. For his foundational work in "scientific wellness" and "personalized nutrition," he was presented with the Grace A. Goldsmith Award in 2016 and Alexander & Mildred Seeling Award in 2023 by American Nutrition Association. He is a National Academy of Medicine ELHM Scholar. The National Academy of Medicine also recognized him with a Healthy Longevity Catalyst Award in 2020.

=== Selected awards ===
- NSF CAREER Award (2009)
- Young Investigator Award—Roy J. Carver Charitable Trust (2010)
- "Tomorrow's PIs"—Genome Technology (2007)
- NIH Howard Temin Pathway to Independence Award (2008)
- Fellow—American Institute for Medical and Biological Engineering
- Camille-Dreyfus Teacher-Scholar Award (2011)

== Selected publications ==
- Hood, Leroy; Price, Nathan (2023). The Age of Scientific Wellness: Why the Future of Medicine Is Personalized, Predictive, Data-Rich, and in Your Hands.
