= Michael R. Gold =

Canadian immunologist and cell biologist (born 1956)

- Born: August 30, 1956 (age 70); United States
- Citizenship: Canadian
- Education: Michigan State University; University of California, Berkeley; University of California, San Francisco
- Known for: Discovery of B-cell receptor stimulates Tyrosine phosphorylation
- Spouse: Linda Matsuuchi
- Scientific career
- Fields: Biology; Immunology; Cell Biology
- Workplaces: University of British Columbia
- Academic advisors: Robert I. Mishell; Anthony DeFranco; Ruedi Aebersold

Michael R. Gold (born August 30, 1956) is a Canadian immunologist and cell biologist. He has served as head of the Department of Microbiology and Immunology at the University of British Columbia since July 2009. He is known for his discovery of how B-cell receptor stimulates Tyrosine phosphorylation and work in the signaling cascade of B-cell receptor.

== Biography ==
Gold was born and raised in New York City, New York, USA in 1956. He attended John Bowne High School in Flushing, New York. and then Michigan State University. He was a graduate student at University of California, Berkeley from 1978 to 1984, under the supervision of Robert I. Mishell. The goal of his Ph.D. project was to characterize biochemically a receptor present on macrophages that recognizes the polymer peptidoglycan. He then entered a postdoctoral fellowship at the University of California, San Francisco from 1985 to 1991, working on B-cell signalling with Anthony DeFranco. He then worked as a research associate in Ruedi Aebersold’s lab at the Institute for Systems Biology in Seattle, Washington, from 1991 to 1993.

Gold's work led to many important findings, emphasizing the importance of how antigen receptors on the surface of B-cells might trigger the adaptive immunity upon recognizing their cognate antigens.

Over a decade, Gold's laboratory has been intensely focusing on how the roles of Rap GTPases in mediating cell mobility, cell migration, tumor motility and metastasis. He is interested in how changes in cytoskeletal structure and function by Rap may affect B-cell receptor activation and signalling cascade. Gold's publications have been cited more than 6,200 times, with an h-index of 42.

Gold is a faculty member of the Department of Microbiology and Immunology at the University of British Columbia, where he teaches immunogenetics. He has been Head of the Department of Microbiology and Immunology since July 2009.

He was the President of the Heart Rhythm Society from 2016 to 2017.

== Fellowships and awards ==
- 2013, Canadian Society for Immunology Cinader Award

== Editorships ==
- Associate editor, Frontiers in B Cell Biology, 2010–present
- Member, Faculty of 1000

== Works ==
- Gold, M. R.; Law, D. A.; Defranco, A. L. (1990). "Stimulation of protein tyrosine phosphorylation by the B-lymphocyte antigen receptor". Nature. 345 (6278): 810–3. Bibcode:1990Natur.345..810G. doi:10.1038/345810a0. PMID 1694265. S2CID 4274362.
- Durand, C. A.; Hartvigsen, K; Fogelstrand, L; Kim, S; Iritani, S; Vanhaesebroeck, B; Witztum, J. L.; Puri, K. D.; Gold, M. R. (2009). "Phosphoinositide 3-kinase p110 delta regulates natural antibody production, marginal zone and B-1 B cell function, and autoantibody responses". The Journal of Immunology. 183 (9): 5673–84. doi:10.4049/jimmunol.0900432. PMID 19843950.
- Lin, K. B.; Freeman, S. A.; Zabetian, S; Brugger, H; Weber, M; Lei, V; Dang-Lawson, M; Tse, K. W.; Santamaria, R; Batista, F. D.; Gold, M. R. (2008). "The rap GTPases regulate B cell morphology, immune-synapse formation, and signaling by particulate B cell receptor ligands". Immunity. 28 (1): 75–87. doi:10.1016/j.immuni.2007.11.019. PMID 18191594.
- McLeod, S. J.; Li, A. H.; Lee, R. L.; Burgess, A. E.; Gold, M. R. (2002). "The Rap GTPases regulate B cell migration toward the chemokine stromal cell-derived factor-1 (CXCL12): Potential role for Rap2 in promoting B cell migration". Journal of Immunology. 169 (3): 1365–71. doi:10.4049/jimmunol.169.3.1365. PMID 12133960.
- Freeman, S. A.; Lei, V; Dang-Lawson, M; Mizuno, K; Roskelley, C. D.; Gold, M. R. (2011). "Cofilin-mediated F-actin severing is regulated by the Rap GTPase and controls the cytoskeletal dynamics that drive lymphocyte spreading and BCR microcluster formation". The Journal of Immunology. 187 (11): 5887–900. doi:10.4049/jimmunol.1102233. PMID 22068232.
