= Katherine Barker =

Katherine Barker may refer to:

- Katherine Barker, a play by Jean Audureau
- Katherine Barker, actress in the 1963 theatrical adaptation The Wars of the Roses
- Katherine 'Ma' Barker, character in the film Ma Barker's Killer Brood

== See also ==
- Catherine Barker, British figure skater
- Katharine Barker (disambiguation)
- Kate Barker (disambiguation)
- Kathy Barker (born 1953), American scientist and science fiction writer
