= Katharine Barker =

Katharine Barker may refer to:

- Katharine Barker (actress) (born 1941), English actress
- Katharine Marie Barker (1891–1984), American painter
- Kate Barker (Katharine Mary Barker, born 1957), British economist

== See also ==
- Katherine Barker (disambiguation)
- Catherine Barker, British figure skater
- Kate Barker (disambiguation)
- Kathy Barker (born 1953), American scientist and science fiction writer
