= Flockhart =

Flockhart and Flockart are surnames. Notable people with the surnames include:

- Adam Flockhart (born 1945), Scottish badminton player
- Bruce Flockhart (born 1997), Scottish rugby union player
- Bruce Flockhart (badminton) (born 1972), Scottish international badminton player
- Calista Flockhart (born 1964), American actress
- David Flockhart (1952–2015), Scottish medical researcher
- Dougie Flockhart (born 1984), Scotland international rugby league & union footballer
- Eileen Flockhart (born 1944), American politician
- Gareth Flockhart (born 1972), Scottish rugby union player
- Joanna Flockhart (born 1947), Scottish badminton player
- Rob Flockhart (1956–2021), Canadian ice hockey player
- Rob Flockhart (rugby union), Scottish rugby union player
- Ron Flockhart (ice hockey) (born 1960), Canadian ice hockey player
- Ron Flockhart (racing driver) (1923–1962), British racing driver
- Sandy Flockhart (born 1951), British banker
- Shannon Flockhart (born 2002), British athlete
- Tom Flockhart (1949–2022), Scottish businessman
- William Flockhart (1808–1871), Scottish chemist
