= Alan Aderem =

American biologist

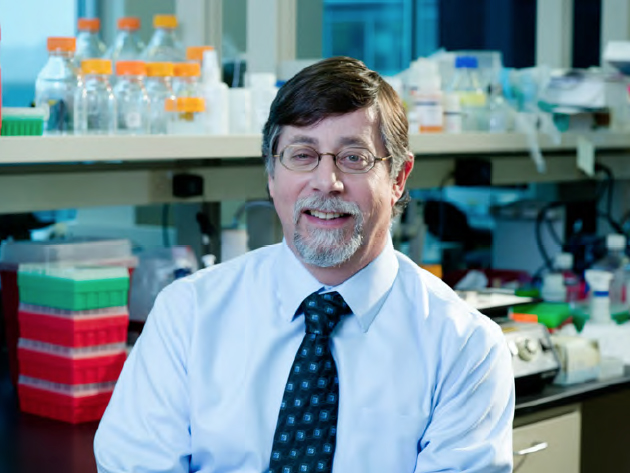
Alan Aderem, PhD

Alan Aderem is an American biologist, specializing in immunology and cell biology. Aderem's particular focus is the innate immune system, the part of the immune system that responds generically to pathogens. His laboratory's research focuses on diseases afflicting citizens of resource poor countries, including AIDS, malaria, tuberculosis and influenza.

== Education ==
A native of South Africa, Aderem joined the anti-apartheid movement as a teen in South Africa. He played a role in trade unions and community movements, and edited a township newspaper. Aderem was banned and put under house arrest for 5 years from 1977 to 1982. He was also a clandestine member of the African National Congress (ANC). He left South Africa in 1982.

Aderem obtained his Ph.D. at the University of Cape Town and completed a postdoctoral fellowship at The Rockefeller University in the laboratory of Zanvil Cohn. Aderem became head of the laboratory of Signal Transduction in 1991. In 1996, he accepted a professorship of Immunology and Medicine at the University of Washington.

== Career ==
In 2012, Aderem became president of Seattle Biomedical Research Institute (Seattle BioMed). Aderem co-founded the Institute for Systems Biology with Leroy Hood and Ruedi Aebersold in 2000 and served as its director until 2011. The ISB, the first institute for systems biology worldwide, focuses on a holistic understanding of biology, health, and disease.

Aderem has edited several journals including The Journal of Experimental Medicine, Current Opinion in Immunology, and Immunological Reviews. His professional honors include a MERIT Award from the National Institutes of Health and a Pew Scholars award, honors from the Burroughs Welcome Fund and the American Heart Association.

Aderem serves on the scientific advisory board of the International AIDS Vaccine Initiative; the science steering committee of the Global HIV Vaccine Enterprise; and as an advisory board member for the NIH LIPID MAPS Consortium. Aderem served as chairman of the board of directors of the Howard Hughes Medical Institute-funded KwaZulu-Natal Research Institute for Tuberculosis and HIV (KRITH). He was appointed chair of the Parliamentary Review Commission of the Medical Research Council of South Africa in 1996 and 2001, and serves as a scientific advisor to the South African government. He also serves on the advisory board of the International Immunology Frontier Research Center at Osaka University and is on the advisory panel of the European Research Council.

== Family ==
Aderem is married to Kathy Barker, with whom he has three children.
