= Ken Stewart =

Ken or Kenneth Stewart or Stuart may refer to:

- Ken Stewart (politician), politician from British Columbia, Canada
- Ken Stewart (ice hockey) (1912–2002), Canadian professional ice hockey player
- Ken Stewart (rugby union) (born 1953), New Zealand rugby union player
- Ken Stewart (rugby league), Australian rugby league player
- Sir Kenneth Stewart, 1st Baronet (1882–1972), Scottish merchant
- Kenneth Stewart (1925–1996), British Labour MEP
- Kenneth Stewart (RNZAF officer) (1915–1960), New Zealand flying ace
- Ken Stuart (microbiologist), American microbiologist
- Kenneth Stuart (1891–1945), Canadian soldier
- Ken Stuart (tennis), American tennis player
