= Nathan Price =

Nathan Price may refer to:

- Nathan C. Price, American engineer and inventor
- Nathan D. Price, American system biologist and researcher
- Matthew Sussman, American actor sometimes credited as Nathan Price
- Nathan Price, one of the individuals to use the supervillain moniker Copperhead in DC Comics
