= Kate Barker (disambiguation) =

Kate Barker (born 1957) is a British economist.

Kate Barker may also refer to:

- Ma Barker (1873–1935), American criminal sometimes known as Kate Barker
- Kate Barker, singer in American pop girl group Girl Authority

== See also ==
- Katharine Barker (disambiguation)
- Catherine Barker, British figure skater
- Katherine Barker (disambiguation)
