= Zhang Hui =

Zhang Hui or Hui Zhang is the name of:

- Zhang Hui (basketball) (born 1959), Chinese female basketball player
- Zhang Hui (speed skater) (born 1988), Chinese female short track speed skater
- Zhang Hui (footballer, born 1997), Chinese male association footballer
- Zhang Hui (footballer, born 2000), Chinese male association footballer
- Hui Zhang (computer scientist), Chinese-American computer scientist
- Hui Zhang (pathologist), Chinese-American pathologist
