= Roger M. Perlmutter =

American immunologist

- Education: Reed College; Washington University in St. Louis
- Known for: Head of research at Amgen and Merck
- Scientific career
- Fields: Immunology
- Workplaces: Merck Research Laboratories
- Academic advisors: Joseph Davie

Roger M. Perlmutter is the former executive vice president of Merck & Co. and former president of Merck Research Laboratories. He is currently CEO of Eikon Therapeutics and a non-executive director of Merck Research Laboratories.

== Education and career ==
He graduated from Reed College and earned his MD and PhD from Washington University in St. Louis in 1979. He did his clinical training in internal medicine at Massachusetts General Hospital and University of California, San Francisco. In 1981, he joined the Division of Biology at the California Institute of Technology before joining the University of Washington in 1984 to join the medicine and biochemistry department. At Caltech he worked closely with Leroy Hood, an important immunologist and later recruited Hood to the University of Washington to serve as founding professor of the Department of Molecular Biotechnology.

In 1989, he was the founding chair of the immunology department. His research focused on the role of tyrosine kinase signaling and its role in lymphocyte development and immunology. During that time he was also a Howard Hughes Medical Institute (HHMI) investigator.

In 1997, Perlmutter joined Merck Research Laboratories as the executive vice president of basic and preclinical research. At the time, Perlmutter was not chosen to replace Edward Scolnik as president of Merck Research Laboratories; that position went instead to Peter S. Kim, previously of the Massachusetts Institute of Technology. In 2001, Perlmutter left Merck and joined Amgen as the executive vice president and head of R&D from January 2001 to February 2012. In 2013, he replaced Peter S. Kim as the executive vice president and president of Merck Research Laboratories. In 2020, he retired from Merck and was replaced by Dean Y. Li. In 2021 he became CEO of a microscopy start-up, Eikon Therapeutics.

He was the president of the American Association of Immunologists from 1999 to 2000 and a fellow of the American Academy of Arts and Sciences and the American Association for the Advancement of Science. He also serves on the boards of the Institute for Systems Biology and StemCells Inc and is a science partner at The Column Group, a venture capital fund focused on biotechnology.
