= Hui Zhang (pathologist) =

Chinese-born biomolecular scientist

Hui Zhang (Chinese: 张会; pinyin: Zhāng Huì) is a professor of Pathology at Johns Hopkins University. She specializes in analysis of glycoproteins and other protein modifications on the proteome scale. Her most cited article is Identification and quantification of N-linked glycoproteins using hydrazide chemistry, stable isotope labeling and mass spectrometry.

== Biography ==
=== Education and career ===
Zhang earned her B.S. (1989) and M.S. (1992) from Peking University, and her Ph.D. (1999) from the University of Pennsylvania.

Zhang joined New England Biolabs and Cell Signal Technology and was promoted to senior scientist. After working with proteomics and glycoproteomics with Dr. Ruedi Aebersold at the Institute for Systems Biology for five years, she joined Johns Hopkins University as an assistant professor in 2006. She was promoted to an associate professor in 2011 and a full professor in 2016.

=== Research ===
At Johns Hopkins, Zhang is director of the Mass Spectrometry Core Facility that she established at the Center for Biomarker Discovery and Translation. Her research studies protein modification on the proteome scale and the effects of modification on protein function and the progression of diseases. Her focus has been on developing high-throughput technologies "to isolate and identify two of the most abundant protein modifications - phosphorylation and glycosylation."

Zhang applies proteomics technologies to determine protein modifications associated with cancer, which may improve early detection and monitoring of therapeutic care. In addition, she is looking into new methods to study protein modifications that may have major implications for a wide range of other health issues.

Zhang is identified as the inventor of five U.S. patents dating from 2001 to 2007.

https://scholar.google.com/citations?user=ununaGsAAAAJ&hl=en

== Selected works ==
https://scholar.google.com/citations?user=ununaGsAAAAJ&hl=en

- Zhang H, Liu T, Zhang Z, Payne SH, Zhang B, McDermott JE, Zhou J, Petyuk VA, Chen L, Ray D, Sun S, Yang F, Chen L, Wang J, Shah P, Cha S-W, Aiyetan P, Woo S, Tian Y, Gritsenko MA, Choi C, Monroe ME, Thomas S, Moore RJ, Yu K-H, Tabb DL, FenyoÌˆ D, Bafna V, Wang Y, Rodriguez H, Boja ES, Hiltke T, Rivers RC, Sokoll L, Zhu H, Shih I-M, Pandey A, Zhang B, Snyder MP, Levine DA, Smith RD, Chan DW, Rodland KD, and the CPTAC investigators. Deep proteogenomic characterization of human ovarian cancer. Cell. 2016; 166: 755–765.
- Sun S, Shah P, Toghi Eshghi S, Yang W, Trikannad N, Yang S, Chen L, Aiyetan P, Hoti NU, Zhang Z, Chan DW, Zhang H*. Comprehensive analysis of protein glycosylation by solid-phase extraction of N-linked glycans and glycosite-containing peptides. Nature Biotechnology. 2016; 34: 84-88
- Shah P, Wang X, Yang W, Toghi Eshghi S, Sun S, Hoti N, Pasay J, Rubin A, Zhang H*. Integrated proteomic and glycoproteomic analyses of prostate cancer cells reveals glycoprotein alteration in protein abundance and glycosylation. Molecular & Cellular Proteomics. 2015; 14: 2753–2763.
- Toghi Eshghi S, Shah P, Yang W, Li X, Zhang H*. GPQuest: A Spectral Library Matching Algorithm for Site-Specific Assignment of Spectra from Tandem Mass Spectrometric Analysis of Intact Glycopeptides. Analytical Chemistry. 2015; 87: 5181–5188.
- Zhang, H., Li, X. J., Martin, D. B., and Aebersold, R. Identification and quantification of N-linked glycoproteins using hydrazide chemistry, stable isotope labeling and mass spectrometry. Nature Biotechnology (2003) 21:660.
- Zhang, H., Zha, X., Tan, Y., Hornbeck, P. V., Mastrangelo, A. J., Alessi, D. R., Polakiewicz, R. D., and Comb, M. J. Phosphoprotein analysis using antibodies broadly reactive against phosphorylated motifs. Journal of Biological Chemistry (2002) 277:39379.
