= William Dreyer =

William Dreyer may refer to:

- William Dreyer, co-founder of Dreyer's, an American producer of ice cream
- William J. Dreyer (1928–2004), molecular immunologist
