= Leroy Hood =

American biologist (born 1938)

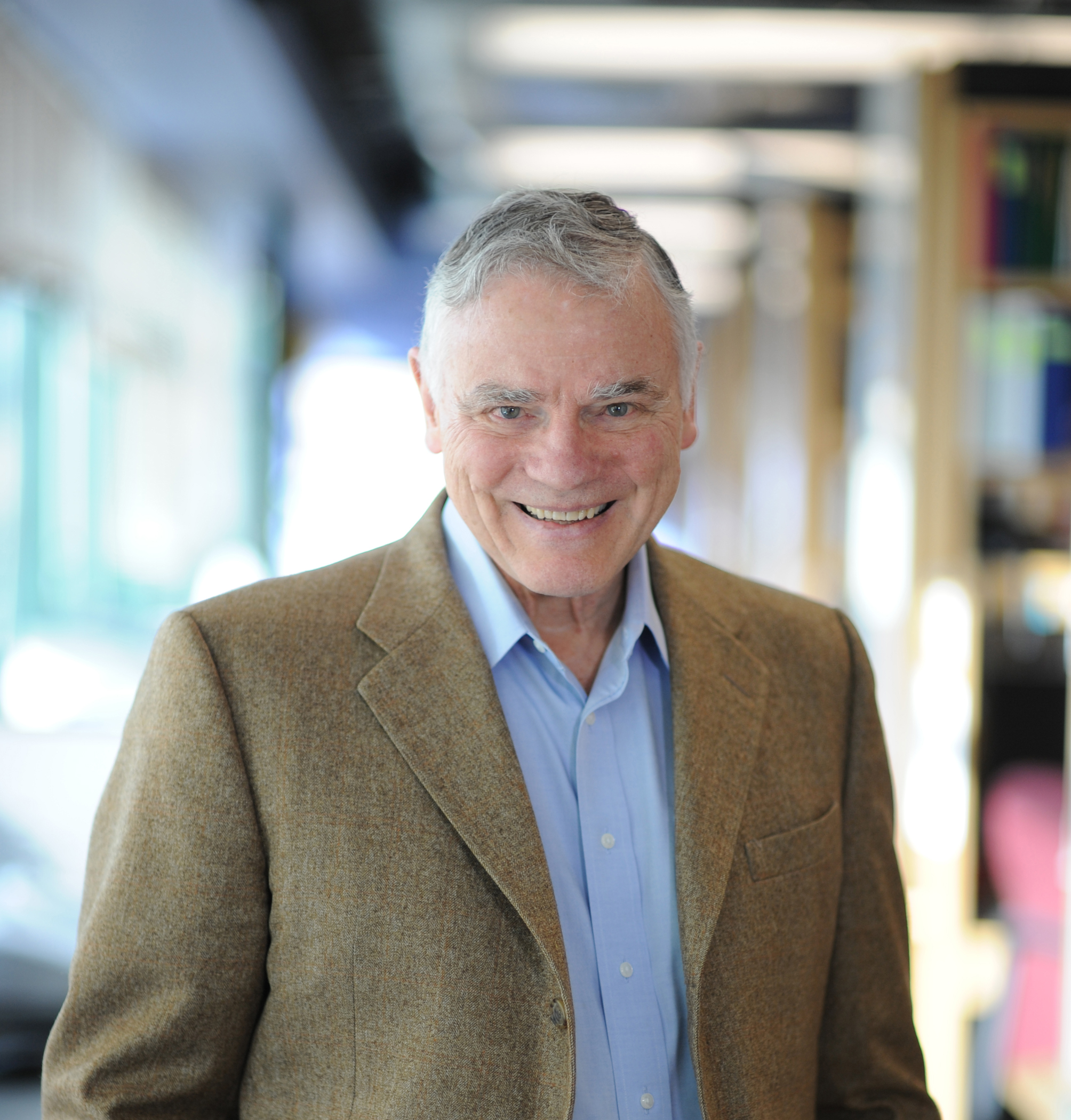
- Leroy Hood, in 2011
- Born: October 10, 1938 (age 88); Missoula, Montana, US
- Education: California Institute of Technology; Johns Hopkins University
- Known for: Scientific instrumentation for DNA sequencing & synthesis, Systems biology, P4 medicine
- Spouse: Valerie Logan
- Awards: Kyoto Prize (2002); Lemelson–MIT Prize (2003); Heinz Award in Technology, the Economy & Employment (2006); Pittcon Heritage Award (2009); Kistler Prize (2010); National Medal of Science (2011); IEEE Medal for Innovations in Healthcare Technology (2014); IRI Medal (2019)
- Scientific career
- Fields: biotechnology, genomics
- Workplaces: Institute for Systems Biology, Caltech, University of Washington
- Thesis: Immunoglobulins: Structure, Genetics, and Evolution (1968)
- Doctoral advisor: William J. Dreyer
- Doctoral students: Mark M. Davis, Trey Ideker, Jared Roach
- Website: hood-price.systemsbiology.org/bio/leroy-hood-md-phd/

Leroy "Lee" Edward Hood (born October 10, 1938) is an American biologist who has served on the faculties at the California Institute of Technology (Caltech) and the University of Washington. His inventions include the first gas phase protein sequencer (1982), for determining the sequence of amino acids in a given protein; a DNA synthesizer (1983), to synthesize short sections of DNA; a peptide synthesizer (1984), to combine amino acids into longer peptides and short proteins; the first automated DNA sequencer (1986), to identify the order of nucleotides in DNA; ink-jet oligonucleotide technology for synthesizing DNA and nanostring technology for analyzing single molecules of DNA and RNA.

The protein sequencer, DNA synthesizer, peptide synthesizer, and DNA sequencer were commercialized through Applied Biosystems, Inc. and the ink-jet technology was commercialized through Agilent Technologies. The automated DNA sequencer was an enabling technology for the Human Genome Project. The peptide synthesizer was used in the synthesis of the HIV protease by Stephen Kent and others, and the development of a protease inhibitor for AIDS treatment.

Hood established the first cross-disciplinary biology department, the Department of Molecular Biotechnology (MBT), at the University of Washington in 1992, and co-founded the Institute for Systems Biology in 2000. Hood is credited with introducing the term "systems biology", and advocates for "P4 medicine", medicine that is "predictive, personalized, preventive, and participatory." Scientific American counted him among the 10 most influential people in the field of biotechnology in 2015.

Hood was elected a member of the National Academy of Engineering in 2007 for the invention and commercialization of key instruments, notably the automated DNA sequencer, that have enabled the biotechnology revolution.

== Early life ==
External videos
- Leroy Hood: Future of Medicine, TedX Rainier
- Profiles of Innovation: Lee Hood at Northeastern University
- 2014 Medal for Innovations in Healthcare Technology, IEEE.tv

Hood was born on October 10, 1938, in Missoula, Montana, to Thomas Edward Hood and Myrtle Evylan Wadsworth. and grew up in Shelby. His father was an electrical engineer, and his mother had a degree in home economics. Hood was one of four children, including a sister and two brothers, including a brother with Down syndrome. One of his grandfathers was a rancher and ran a summer geology camp for university students, which Hood attended as a high school student. Hood excelled in math and science, being one of forty students nationally to win a Westinghouse Science Talent Search. In addition, Hood played several high school sports and debate, the latter of which he would credit for his success in science communication later in his career.

== Education ==
Hood received his undergraduate education from the California Institute of Technology (Caltech), where his professors included notables such as Richard Feynman and Linus Pauling. Hood received an MD from Johns Hopkins School of Medicine in 1964 and a PhD from Caltech in 1968, where he worked with William J. Dreyer on antibody diversity. Dreyer is credited with giving Hood two important pieces of advice: "If you want to practice biology, do it on the leading edge, and if you want to be on the leading edge, invent new tools for deciphering biological information."

== Career ==
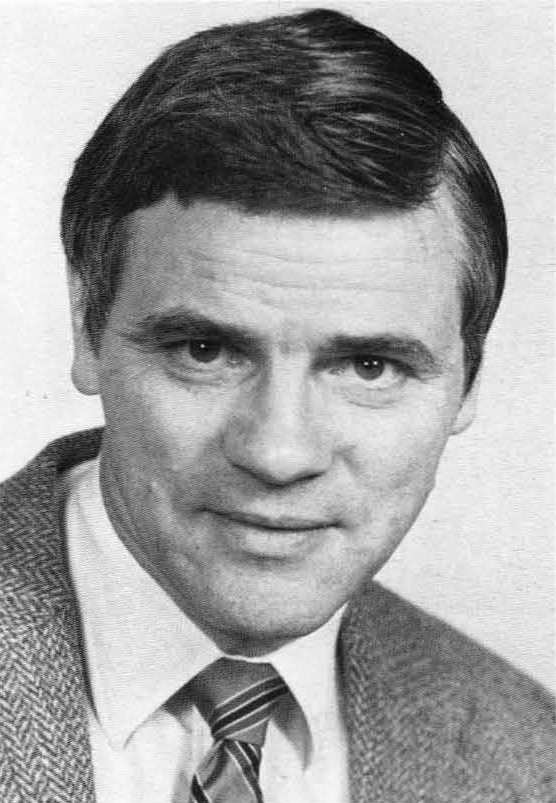
Hood in 1986

In 1967, Hood joined the National Institutes of Health (NIH), to work in the immunology branch of the National Cancer Institute as a senior investigator.

In 1970, he returned to Caltech as an assistant professor. He was promoted to associate professor in 1973, full professor in 1975, and was named Bowles Professor of Biology in 1977. He served as chairman of the Division of Biology from 1980-1989 and director of Caltech's Special Cancer Center in 1981.

Hood has been a leader and a proponent of cross-disciplinary research in chemistry and biology. In 1989 he stepped down as chairman of the Division of Biology to create and become director of a newly funded NSF Science and Technology Center at Caltech. The NSF Center for the Development of an Integrated Protein and Nucleic Acid Biotechnology became one of the founding research centers of the Beckman Institute at Caltech in 1989. By this time, Hood's laboratory included more than 100 researchers, a much larger group than was usual at Caltech. A relatively small school, Caltech was not well-suited to the creation of the type of large interdisciplinary research organization that Hood sought.

In October 1991, Hood announced that he would move to the University of Washington at Seattle, to found and direct the first cross-disciplinary biology department, the Department of Molecular Biotechnology (MBT) at the University of Washington Medical School. The new department was financed by a US $12-million gift from Bill Gates, who shared Hood's interest in combining biological research and computer technology and applying them to medical research. Roger Perlmutter, who had worked in Hood's lab at Caltech before moving to UW as chair of the immunology department, played a key role organizing his recruitment to UW. Hood and other scientists from Caltech's NSF center moved to the University of Washington during 1992-1994, where they received renewed support from the NSF as the Center for Molecular Biotechnology. (Later, in 2001, the department of molecular biotechnology and the genetics department at UW reorganized to form the department of genome sciences.)

In 2000 Hood resigned his position at the University of Washington to become co-founder and president of the non-profit Institute for Systems Biology (ISB), possibly the first independent systems biology organization. His co-founders were protein chemist Ruedi Aebersold and immunologist Alan Aderem. Hood is still an affiliate professor at the University of Washington in Computer Science, Bioengineering and Immunology. In April 2017, the ISB announced that Hood will be succeeded as president of ISB as of January 2018 by James Heath, while continuing to lead his research group at ISB and serving on ISB's board of directors.

Hood believes that a combination of big data and systems biology has the potential to revolutionize healthcare and create a proactive medical approach focused on maximizing the wellness of the individual. He coined the term "P4 medicine" in 2003. In 2010 ISB partnered with the Ohio State University Wexner Medical Center in Columbus, Ohio, to establish the nonprofit P4 Medicine Institute (P4MI). Its goal was stated as being "to lead the transformation of healthcare from a reactive system to one that predicts and prevents disease, tailors diagnosis and therapy to the individual consumer and engages patients in the active pursuit of a quantified understanding of wellness; i.e. one that is predictive, preventive, personalized and participatory (P4)." In 2012, P4 Medical Institute established an agreement with its first community health partner, PeaceHealth. PeaceHealth is a not-for-profit Catholic health care system, operating in a variety of communities in Alaska, Washington and Oregon. In 2016, ISB affiliated with Providence Health & Services, and Hood became the senior vice president of Providence St. Joseph Health and its chief science officer.

Hood has published more than 700 peer-reviewed papers, received 36 patents, and co-authored textbooks in biochemistry, immunology, molecular biology, and genetics. In addition, he co-authored, with Daniel J. Kevles, The Code of Codes, a popular book on the sequencing of the human genome.

He has been instrumental in founding 15 biotechnology companies, including Amgen, Applied Biosystems, Systemix, Darwin, Rosetta Inpharmatics, Integrated Diagnostics, and Accelerator Corporation. In 2015, he co-founded a startup called Arivale offering a subscription-based 'scientific wellness' service which shut down in 2019. While praising the quality of its offering, industry commentators attributed Arivale's closure to a failure to capture sufficient Customer lifetime value to create a profit from providing the service, suggesting that insufficient numbers of customers stuck with the data-driven, personalized dietary and lifestyle coaching it provided for long enough at a price point which would make the business model work.

== Research ==
=== Genomics and proteomics ===
At Caltech, Hood and his colleagues created the technological foundation for the study of genomics and proteomics by developing five groundbreaking instruments - the protein sequencer (1982), the DNA synthesizer (1983), the peptide synthesizer (1984),the automated DNA sequencer (1986) and later the ink-jet DNA synthesizer. Hood's instruments incorporated concepts of high throughput data accumulation through automation and parallelization. When applied to the study of protein and DNA chemistries, these ideas were essential to the rapid deciphering of biological information.

Hood had a strong interest in commercial development, actively filing patents and seeking private funding. Applied Biosystems, Inc. (initially named GeneCo.) was formed in 1981 in Foster City, California, to commercialize instruments developed by Hood, Hunkapiller, Caruthers, and others. The company was supported by venture capitalist William K. Bowes, who hired Sam H. Eletr and André Marion as president and vice-president of the new company. The company shipped the first gas phase protein sequencer, Model 4790A, in August 1982. The 380 DNA synthesizer was commercialized in 1983, the 430A peptide synthesizer in 1984, and the 370A DNA sequencing system in 1986.

These new instruments had a major impact on the emerging fields of proteomics and genomics. The gas-liquid phase protein sequencer was developed with Michael W. Hunkapiller, then a research fellow at Caltech. The instrument makes use of the chemical process known as the Edman degradation, devised by Pehr Edman. Edman and Begg's 1967 design involves placing a protein or peptide sample into a spinning cup in a temperature controlled chamber. Reagents are added to cleave the protein one amino acid at the time, followed by solvents to allow extraction of reagents and byproducts. A series of analysis cycles is performed to identify a sequence, one cycle for each amino acid, and the cycle times were lengthy. Hood and Hunkapiller made a number of modifications, further automating steps in the analysis and improving effectiveness and shortening cycle time. By applying reagents in the gas phase instead of the liquid phase, the retention of the sample during the analysis and the sensitivity of the instrument were increased. Polybrene was used as a substrate coating to better anchor proteins and peptides, and the purification of reagents was improved. HPLC analysis techniques were used to reduce analysis times and extend the technique's applicable range. The amount of protein required for an analysis decreased, from 10-100 nanomoles for Edman and Begg's protein sequencer, to the low picomole range, a revolutionary increase in the sensitivity of the technology. The new sequencer offered significant advantages in speed and sample size compared to commercial sequencers of the time, the most popular of which were built by Beckman Instruments. Commercialized as the Model 470A protein sequencer, it allowed scientists to determine partial amino acid sequences of proteins that had not previously been accessible, characterizing new proteins and better understanding their activity, function, and effects in therapeutics. These discoveries had significant ramifications in biology, medicine, and pharmacology.

The first automated DNA synthesizer resulted from a collaboration with Marvin H. Caruthers of the University of Colorado Boulder, and was based on Caruthers' work elucidating the chemistry of phosphoramidite oligonucleotide synthesis. Caltech staff scientist Suzanna J. Horvath worked with Hood and Hunkapiller to learn Caruthers' techniques in order to design a prototype that automated the repetitive steps involved in Caruthers' method for DNA synthesis. The resulting prototype was capable of forming short pieces of DNA called oligonucleotides, which could be used in DNA mapping and gene identification. The first commercial phosphoramidite DNA synthesizer was developed from this prototype by Applied Biosystems, who installed the first Model 380A in Caruthers' lab at the University of Colorado in December 1982, before beginning official commercial shipment of the new instrument. Revolutionizing the field of molecular biology, the DNA synthesizer enabled biologists to synthesize DNA fragments for cloning and other genetic manipulations. Molecular biologists were able to produce DNA probes and primers for use in DNA sequencing and mapping, gene cloning, and gene synthesis. The DNA synthesizer played a critical role in the identification of many important genes and in the development of the polymerase chain reaction (PCR), the critical technique used to amplify segments of DNA a million-fold.

The first commercial automated peptide synthesizer, sometimes referred to as a protein synthesizer, was developed by Hood and Stephen B. H. Kent, a senior research associate at Caltech from 1983 to 1989. The automated, programmable peptide synthesizer had previously been invented and developed by Bruce Merrifield and colleagues at Rockefeller University, and Merrifield received the Novel Prize for this invention. The peptide synthesizer assembles long peptides and short proteins from amino acid subunits, in quantities sufficient for subsequent analysis of their structure and function. The commercially available instrument from Applied Biosystems led to a number of significant results, including the synthesis of HIV-1 protease in a collaboration between Kent and Merck and the analysis of its crystalline structure. Based on this research, Merck developed an important antiprotease drug for the treatment of AIDS. Kent carried out a number of important synthesis and structure-function studies in Hood's lab at Caltech.

Among the notable of the inventions from Hood's lab was the automated DNA sequencer. It made possible high-speed sequencing of the structure of DNA, including the human genome. It automated many of the tasks that researchers had previously done by hand. Researchers Jane Z. Sanders and Lloyd M. Smith developed a way to color code the basic nucleotide units of DNA with fluorescent tags, green for adenine (A), yellow-green for guanine (G), orange for cytosine (C) and red for thymine (T). Four differently colored fluorophores, each one specific to a reaction with one of the bases, are covalently attached to the oligonucleotide primer for the enzymatic DNA sequence analysis. During the analysis, fragments are passed downwards through a gel tube, the smallest and lightest fragments passing through the gel tube first. A laser light passed through a filter wheel causes the bases to fluoresce. The resulting fluorescent colors are detected by a photomultiplier and recorded by a computer. The first DNA fragment to be sequenced was a common cloning vector, M13.

The DNA sequencer was a critical technology for the Human Genome Project. Hood was involved with the Human Genome Project from its first meeting, held at the University of California, Santa Cruz, in 1985. Hood became an enthusiastic advocate for The Human Genome Project and its potential. Hood directed the Human Genome Center's sequencing of portions of human chromosomes 14 and 15.

At the University of Washington in the 1990s, Hood, Alan Blanchard, and others developed ink-jet DNA synthesis technology for creating DNA microarrays. By 2004, their ink-jet DNA synthesizer supported high-throughput identification and quantification of nucleic acids through the creation of one of the first DNA array chips, with expression levels numbering tens of thousands of genes. Array analysis has become a standard technique for molecular biologists who wish to monitor gene expression. DNA ink-jet printer technology has had a significant impact on genomics, biology, and medicine.

=== Immunology and neurobiology ===
Hood also made generative discoveries in the field of molecular immunology. His studies of the amino acid sequences of immunoglobulins (also known as antibodies) helped to fuel the 1970s' debate regarding the generation of immune diversity and supported the hypothesis advanced by William J. Dreyer that immunoglobulin (antibody) chains are encoded by two separate genes (a constant and a variable gene). He (and others) conducted pioneering studies on the structure and diversity of the antibody genes. This research led to verification of the "two genes, one polypeptide" hypothesis and insights into the mechanisms responsible for the diversification of the immunoglobulin variable genes. Hood shared the Lasker Award in 1987 for these studies.

Additionally, Hood was among the first to study, at the gene level, the MHC (major histocompatibility complex) gene family and the T-cell receptor gene families as well as being among first to demonstrate that alternative RNA splicing was a fundamental mechanism for generating alternative forms of antibodies. He showed that RNA splicing is the mechanism for generating the membrane bound and the secreted forms of antibodies.

In neurobiology, Hood and his colleagues were the first to clone and study the myelin basic protein (MBP) gene. The MBP is a central component in the sheath that wraps and protects neurons. Hood demonstrated that the condition called "shiverer mouse" arose from a defect in the MBP gene. Hood's research group corrected the neurological defect in mice (the shiverer defect) by transferring a normal MBP gene into the fertilized egg of the shiverer mouse. These discoveries led to extensive studies of MBP and its biology.

=== Systems biology and systems medicine ===
Beginning in the 1990s, Hood focused more on cross-disciplinary biology and systems biology. He established in 1992 the first cross-disciplinary biology department, the Molecular Biotechnology Department at the University of Washington. In 2000, he co-founded the Institute for Systems Biology (ISB) in Seattle, Washington to develop strategies and technologies for systems approaches to biology and medicine. He co-led the Hood-Price research lab at ISB with Nathan Price until Price left to join Center for Human Healthspan at the Buck Institute for Research on Aging.

Hood pioneered the systems biology concept of considering human biology as a "network of networks." In this model, understanding how systems function requires knowledge of: (1) the components of each network (including genetic, molecular, cellular, organ networks), (2) how these networks inter- and intra-connect, (3) how the networks change over time and undergo perturbations, and (4) how function is achieved within these networks. At the ISB under Hood's direction, genomic, transcriptomic, metabolomic and proteomic technologies are used to understand the "network of networks" and are focused on diverse biological systems (e.g. yeast, mice and humans).

Hood applies the notion of systems biology to the study of medicine, specifically to cancer and neurodegenerative disease. His research article on a systems approach to prion diseases in 2009 was one of the first to thoroughly explore the use of systems biology to interrogate the dynamic network changes in disease models. These studies are the first to explain the dynamics of diseased-perturbed networks and have expanded to include frontal temporal dementia and Huntington's disease. Hood is also studying glioblastoma in mice and humans from the systems viewpoint.

Hood advocates several practices in the burgeoning field of systems medicine, including: (1) The use of family genome sequencing, integrating genetics and genomics, to identify genetic variants associated with health and disease (2) The use of targeted proteomics and biomarkers as a window into health and disease. He has pioneered the discovery of biomarker panels for lung cancer and posttraumatic stress syndrome. (3) The use of systems biology to stratify disease into its different subtypes allowing for more effective treatment. (4) The use of systems strategies to identify new types of drug targets to facilitate and accelerate the drug discovery process.

=== P4 medicine ===
Since 2002 Hood has progressively expanded his vision of the future of medicine: first focusing on predictive and preventive (2P) Medicine; then predictive, preventive and personalized (3P) Medicine; and finally predictive, preventive, personalized and participatory, also known as P4 Medicine. Hood states that P4 Medicine is the convergence of systems medicine, big data and patient (consumer) driven healthcare and social networks.

Hood envisions that by the mid-2020s each individual will be surrounded by a virtual cloud of billions of data points and will have the computational tools to analyze this data and produce simple approaches to optimize wellness and minimize disease for each individual. According to this view, the patient's demand for better healthcare will be the real driving force for the acceptance of P4 Medicine by the medical community. This driving force is exemplified by the movement known as the quantified self, which uses digital devices to monitor self-parameters such as weight, activity, sleep, diet, etc. His view is that P4 Medicine will transform the practice of medicine over the next decade, moving it from a largely reactive, disease-care approach to a proactive P4 approach that is predictive, preventive, personalized and participatory.

In 2010, Hood co-founded the P4 Medicine institute (P4Mi), for the development of Predictive, Preventive, Personalized and Participatory (P4) Medicine. In 2021 Hood founded Phenome Health, a non profit focused on implementing his vision. He argues that P4 Medicine will improve healthcare, decrease its cost and promote innovation.

== Awards and honors ==
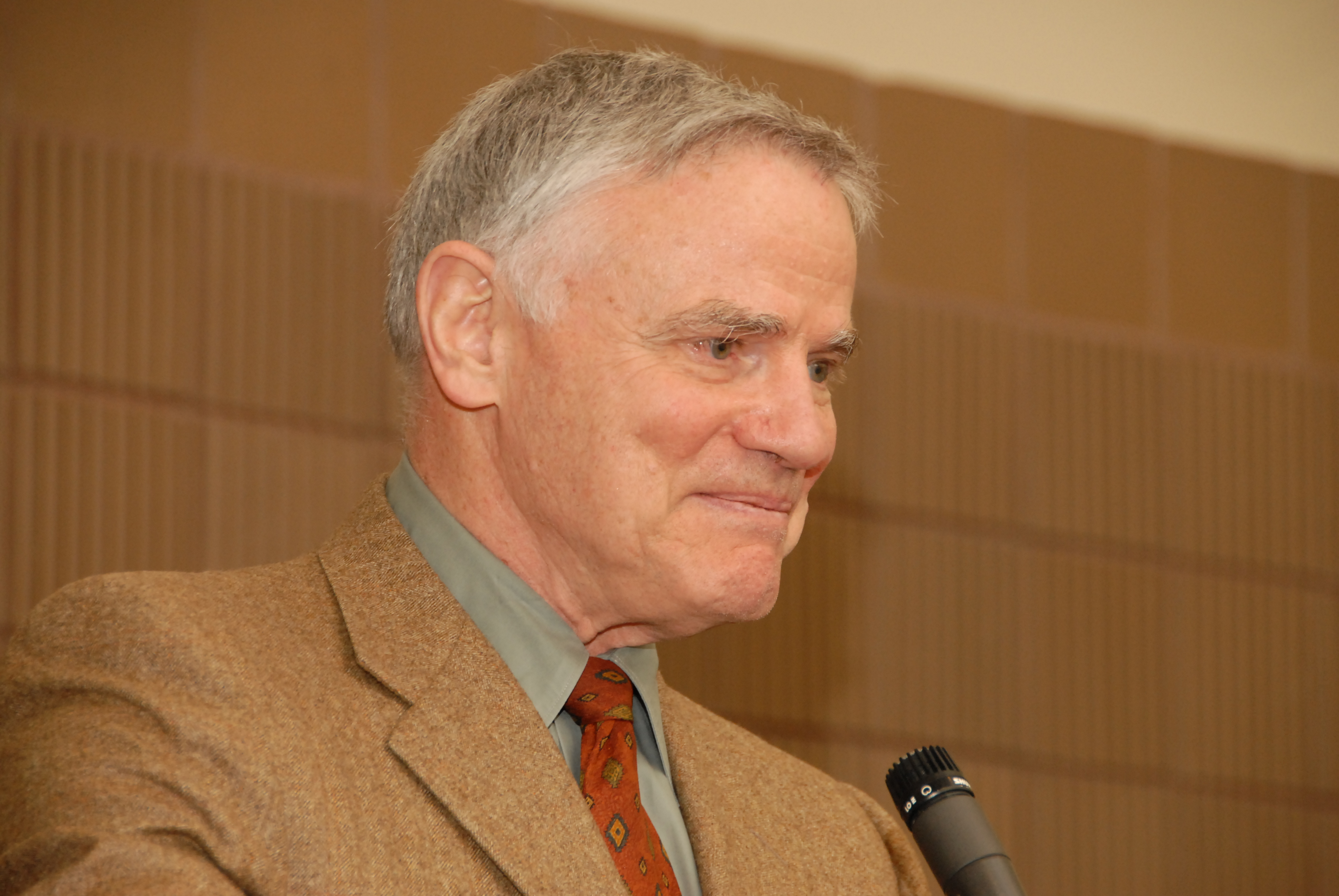
Leroy Hood, 2008 Pittcon Heritage Award recipient

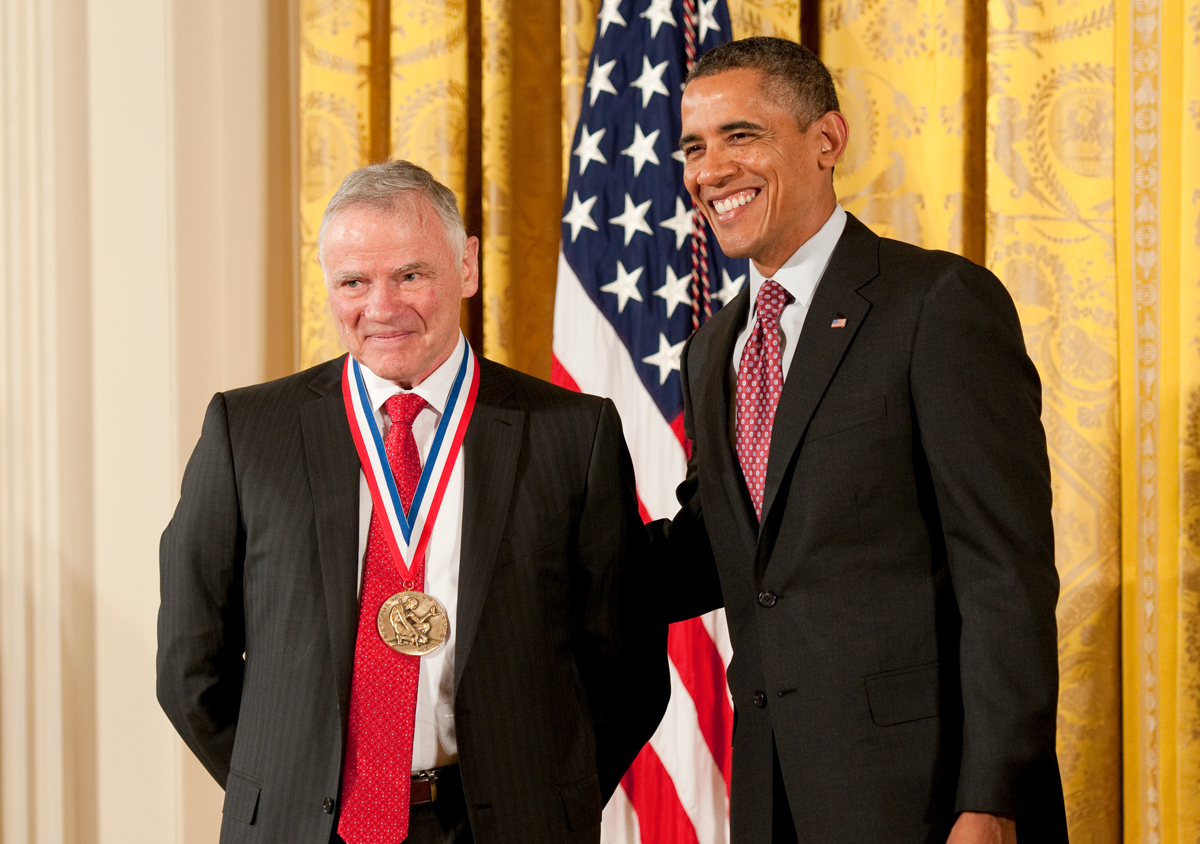
Dr. Lee Hood receiving the National Medal of Science from President Obama

Leroy Hood is a member of the National Academy of Sciences (NAS, 1982), the National Academy of Engineering (2007), the National Academy of Medicine (formerly the Institute of Medicine, 2003), and the National Academy of Inventors (2012). He is one of only 15 scientists ever elected to all three national academies. He is also a member of the American Academy of Arts and Sciences (1982), a member of the American Philosophical Society (2000), a fellow of the American Society for Microbiology, and a charter fellow of the National Academy of Inventors (2012). He has received 17 honorary degrees from institutions including Johns Hopkins and Yale University.

In 1987 Hood shared the Albert Lasker Award for Basic Medical Research with Philip Leder and Susumu Tonegawa for studies of the mechanism of immune diversity. He subsequently was awarded the Dickson Prize in 1988. In 1987, Hood also received the Golden Plate Award of the American Academy of Achievement.

He won the 2002 Kyoto Prize for Advanced Technology for developing automated technologies for analyzing proteins and genes; the 2003 Lemelson-MIT Prize for Innovation and Invention for inventing "four instruments that have unlocked much of the mystery of human biology" by helping decode the genome; the 2004 Biotechnology Heritage Award; the 2004 Association for Molecular Pathology Award for Excellence in Molecular Diagnostics the 2006 Heinz Award in Technology, the Economy and Employment, for breakthroughs in biomedical science on the genetic level; inclusion in the 2007 Inventors Hall of Fame for the automated DNA sequencer; the 2008 Pittcon Heritage Award for helping to transform the biotechnology industry; and the 2010 Kistler Prize for contributions to genetics that have increased knowledge of the human genome and its relationship to society. Leroy Hood won the 2011 Fritz J. and Dolores H. Russ Prize "for automating DNA sequencing that revolutionized biomedicine and forensic science"; the 2011 National Medal of Science, presented at a White House ceremony by President Obama in early 2013; the IEEE Medal for Innovations in Healthcare Technology in 2014, and the 2016 Ellis Island Medal of Honor. In 2017 he received the NAS Award for Chemistry in Service to Society. In 2019 Hood was awarded the IRI Medal, established by the Industrial Research Institute (IRI).

== See also ==
- 100K Wellness Project, a Framingham like clinical study set up by Hood which utilizes technological health data & measurement
