= Dean Y. Li =

American businessman

- Education: University of Chicago; Washington University in St. Louis
- Known for: President of Merck Research Laboratories
- Scientific career
- Fields: Oncology
- Institutions: Merck Research Laboratories, University of Utah
- Academic advisors: Mark Keating

Dean Y. Li is an executive vice president of Merck & Co. and president of Merck Research Laboratories since January 2021.

He graduated from University of Chicago and earned his MD and PhD from Washington University School of Medicine. He then joined University of Utah to do his post-doc with Mark Keating and joined the University of Utah Health Science Center as a professor of medicine and cardiology. At the University of Utah, he served as the vice dean for research and chief scientific officer for University of Utah Health Care. In 2017, he joined Merck as the vice president and head of translational medicine and was subsequently promoted to senior vice president, discovery sciences and translational medicine. In 2020, he was appointed president of Merck Research Laboratories to replace Roger M. Perlmutter.

At the University of Utah, he co-founded a number of biotechnology companies, including Recursion, Hydra Biosciences and Navigen Pharmaceuticals. He is a member of the American Society for Clinical Investigation and the Association of American Physicians.
