= Peter S. Kim =

American scientist (born 1958)

Peter Kim
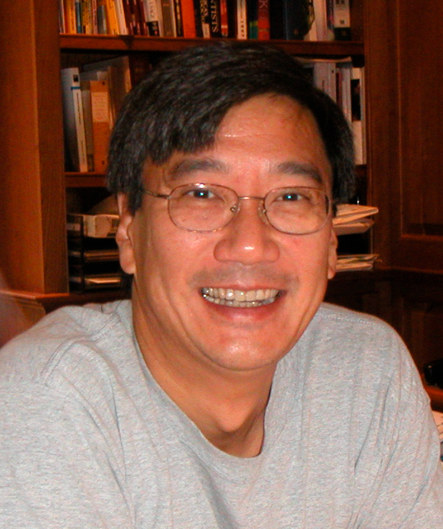
- Born: April 27, 1958 (age 68)
- Education: Cornell University (BA); Stanford University (PhD)
- Known for: Discovering how proteins cause viral membranes to fuse with cells.
- Awards: Member of the National Academy of Sciences (1997); Member of National Academy of Medicine (2000); Member of the National Academy of Engineering (2016)
- Scientific career
- Workplaces: Massachusetts Institute of Technology; Merck & Co., Inc. Stanford University
- Thesis: Characterization of protein folding intermediates (1985)
- Doctoral advisor: Robert L. Baldwin
- Website: peterkimlab.stanford.edu

Peter S. Kim (born April 27, 1958) is an American scientist. He was president of Merck Research Laboratories (MRL) 2003–2013 and is currently Virginia & D.K. Ludwig Professor of Biochemistry at Stanford University, Institute Scholar at Stanford ChEM-H, and Investigator at the Chan Zuckerberg Biohub. Earlier, he was Professor of Biology at MIT, a Member of the Whitehead Institute, and an HHMI Investigator.

Kim is an elected member of the National Academy of Sciences, National Academy of Medicine, and National Academy of Engineering known for leadership in the discovery and development of novel drugs and vaccines used worldwide.

== Early life and education ==
Kim is of Korean descent. Kim grew up in Ridgewood, New Jersey, the son of a single mother. His first job was in 1974 at a Roy Rogers restaurant, where he earned money to pay for college. Kim earned his A.B. in chemistry at Cornell University in 1979 where he conducted research with the late George P. Hess. He received his Ph.D. in biochemistry at Stanford University under the guidance of Robert L. ("Buzz") Baldwin.

== Career and research ==
After his PhD, Kim was appointed by David Baltimore as one of the early Whitehead Fellows at the Whitehead Institute. Later, Kim was a professor of biology at Massachusetts Institute of Technology (MIT), a Member of the Whitehead Institute and an investigator at the Howard Hughes Medical Institute.

Kim is known for his studies of coiled coils and for discovering how proteins cause viral membranes to fuse with cells. The "spring-loaded mechanism" for viral membrane fusion laid the foundation for protein-engineering efforts aimed at stabilizing the metastable native state of membrane-fusion proteins, a critical feature of several vaccines, including those for SARS-CoV-2. He has a special interest in HIV/AIDS research and designed compounds that stop membrane fusion by HIV, thereby preventing it from infecting cells, and has pioneered efforts to develop an HIV vaccine based on similar principles. Kim also served as a member of the National Institutes of Health (NIH) AIDS Vaccine Research Committee.

Kim joined Merck Research Laboratories (MRL) in 2001 as executive vice president, Research and Development. He was promoted to president in January 2003. In this role Kim oversaw all of Merck's drug and vaccine research and development activities.

During his tenure, Merck gained approval of more than 20 new medicines and vaccines. These include Januvia (the first DPP-4 inhibitor for type 2 diabetes), Gardasil (the first vaccine for prevention of cervical cancer), Isentress (the first HIV integrase inhibitor), Zostavax (the first vaccine for the prevention of shingles in adults), and Rotateq (an oral vaccine for the prevention of rotavirus infection in infants). He also led the biomarker-based development of Keytruda. In 2013, he retired from Merck and was succeeded by Roger Perlmutter. He was appointed to the faculty at Stanford University in 2014.

== Awards and honors ==
Kim is a member of the National Academy of Sciences, the National Academy of Medicine, the National Academy of Engineering, and a fellow of the American Academy of Arts and Sciences. Other honors include:

- NAS Award in Molecular Biology (1993)
- Eli Lilly Award in Biological Chemistry (1994)
- DuPont Merck Young Investigator Award of the Protein Society (1994)
- Samsung Foundation Ho-Am Prize in Basic Science (1998)
- The Hans Neurath Award of the Protein Society (1999)
- Doctor of Science, Honoris Causa, Pohang University of Science and Technology (2011)
- The Arthur Kornberg and Paul Berg Lifetime Achievement Award in Biomedical Sciences, Stanford University (2018)

=== Elected memberships ===
- Member, National Academy of Sciences
- Member, National Academy of Medicine (formerly Institute of Medicine)
- Member, National Academy of Engineering
- Member, American Academy of Arts and Sciences
- Fellow, American Association for the Advancement of Science
- Fellow, American Academy of Microbiology
- Fellow, Biophysical Society
- Member, Korean Academy of Science and Technology

=== Service ===
- Council, National Academy of Sciences
- Council, National Academy of Medicine
- Medical Advisory Board, Howard Hughes Medical Institute
- Scientific Advisory Board, Vaccine Research Center, National Institutes of Health
- Council, Global HIV Vaccine Enterprise
- AIDS Vaccine Research Committee, National Institutes of Health
- MIT Corporation, visiting committee, department of biology, MIT
