= Center for Global Infectious Disease Research =

Medical research center in the United States

Coordinates: 47°37′16″N 122°20′20″W

Center for Infectious Disease Research
- Type: Non-profit organization
- Industry: Biomedical research, Global health, Infectious disease
- Founded: 1976
- Founder: Ken Stuart
- Headquarters: Seattle, Washington
- Key people: Ken Stuart, President/Founder
- Revenue: 51,386,660 United States dollar (2011)
- Total assets: 42,541,497 United States dollar (2011)
- Number of employees: 250+
- Parent: Seattle Children's Research Institute
- Website: http://www.seattlebiomed.org/

The Center for Global Infectious Disease Research is a medical research organization based in Seattle, Washington, United States. It has been part of the Seattle Children's Research Institute since 2018. At the time of the merger, CID Research had 166 scientists and were based in the South Lake Union neighborhood. Its mission was to eliminate the world's most devastating infectious diseases through leadership in scientific discovery. The institute's research focused on four areas of infectious disease: HIV/AIDS, malaria, tuberculosis (TB), and Emerging & Neglected Diseases (END) like African sleeping sickness, leishmaniasis, Chagas disease, and toxoplasmosis. CID Research was engaged in early stages of the scientific pipeline including bench science and malaria clinical trials and has expertise in immunology, vaccinology, and drug discovery.

== History ==
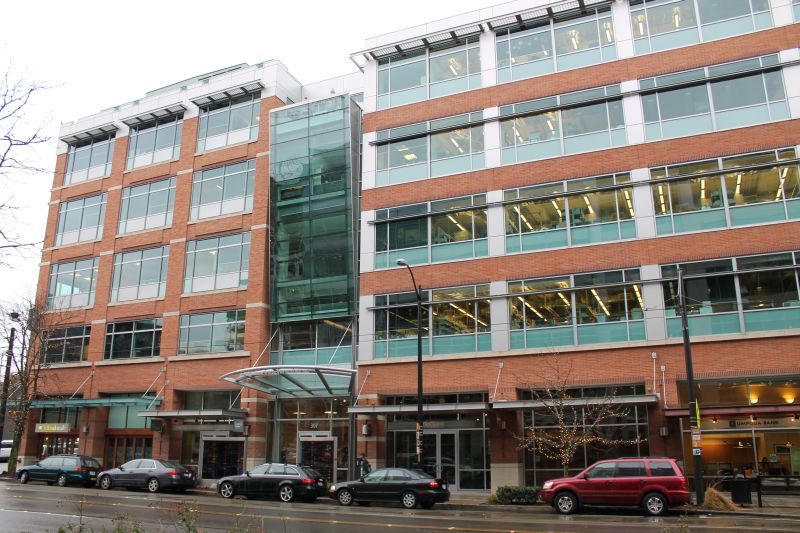
Seattle BioMed headquarters on Westlake Avenue

In 1976, founders Ruth W. Shearer, Ph.D., and Kenneth Stuart, Ph.D., set up a research laboratory in Issaquah, WA. Originally called the Issaquah Group for Health and Environmental Research, the name was soon changed to Issaquah Biomedical Research Institute. Scientists at the Institute studied parasites including ones that cause malaria and African sleeping sickness. In 1986, the Institute relocated to Seattle, Washington, to enhance its scientific programs and became Seattle Biomedical Research Institute (SBRI).

In January 2012, Alan Aderem, Ph.D. became president of Seattle BioMed, only the second in its 36-year history, with Stuart remaining in an active role as President Emeritus and Founder. As part of the Institute's plan for scientific expansion, Aderem led the implementation of integrating systems biology approaches to understanding infectious disease. In April 2017, Dr. John Aitchison became the organization's third president and director.

The organization's name was changed to the Center for Infectious Disease Research in April 2015 to better reflect its focus.

Its merger with Seattle Children's Research Institute was announced in July 2018 and finalized on October 1. Until this time, it was the largest independent, non-profit organization in the United States focused solely on infectious disease discovery research.

== Research ==
The Center for Infectious Disease Research performed research on four areas of infectious disease:HIV/AIDS, malaria, tuberculosis (TB), and Emerging & Neglected Diseases (END) like African sleeping sickness, leishmaniasis, Chagas disease, and toxoplasmosis. Seattle is a hub for global health research, and in July 2012, Seattle Magazine honored two Seattle BioMed leaders (Dr. Stuart and Theresa Britschgi, Director of BioQuest) as "Top Docs" for the work they're doing in research and scientific training.

As part of a broad global initiative to fight malaria, CID Research developed its malaria program in 2000, with an initial grant from the Bill & Melinda Gates Foundation. With a three-pronged approach, the organization's malaria program was focused on vaccine discovery for pregnancy malaria, severe malaria in children, and liver-stage malaria. In 2005, it received two Grand Challenges in Global Health grants, which are sponsored by the Gates, to accelerate its malaria research. And in 2011, it was granted another $9 million from the Gates Foundation to support malaria vaccine efforts.

In 2010, Dr. Stefan Kappe developed his own malaria vaccine candidate which was a weakened form of the malaria parasite, and that vaccine candidate was undergoing clinical trials at Walter Reed near Washington, D.C. Soon after, in collaboration with PATH's Malaria Vaccine Initiative, CID Research became home to one of four malaria clinical trial centers in the world where treatments and vaccines could be safely tested in humans using the human challenge model.

== Education and training ==
One education program offered by CID Research to engage and mobilize the next generation of scientists was BioQuest Academy, a "biomedical boot camp" for 11th graders with over 60 hours (two weeks) of intensive instruction through a global health curriculum. BioQuest Academy was a STEM career pipeline. In fact, according to a study published in the journal PLOS ONE in 2010, "97% of alumni (2005–2008) are attending postsecondary schools throughout North America; eight graduates have already published scientific articles in peer-reviewed journals and/or presented their scientific data at national and international meetings, and 26 have been retained by Seattle BioMed researchers as compensated technicians and interns."
