= 100K Wellness Project =

Clinical study using health data

The 100K Wellness Project was a 10-month Framingham-style longitudinal study, organized by Leroy Hood. The pilot phase took place between March and December 2014.

Participants submitted integrated data from whole-genome sequencing, gut microbiome, clinical laboratory tests and quantified self measures to provide actionable results for health coaching.

It showed actionable opportunities in all participants, and participants followed actionable guidelines about 70 percent of the time.

It later would transition into the wellness startup Arivale.
