= David Flockhart =

Scottish medical researcher (1952–2015)

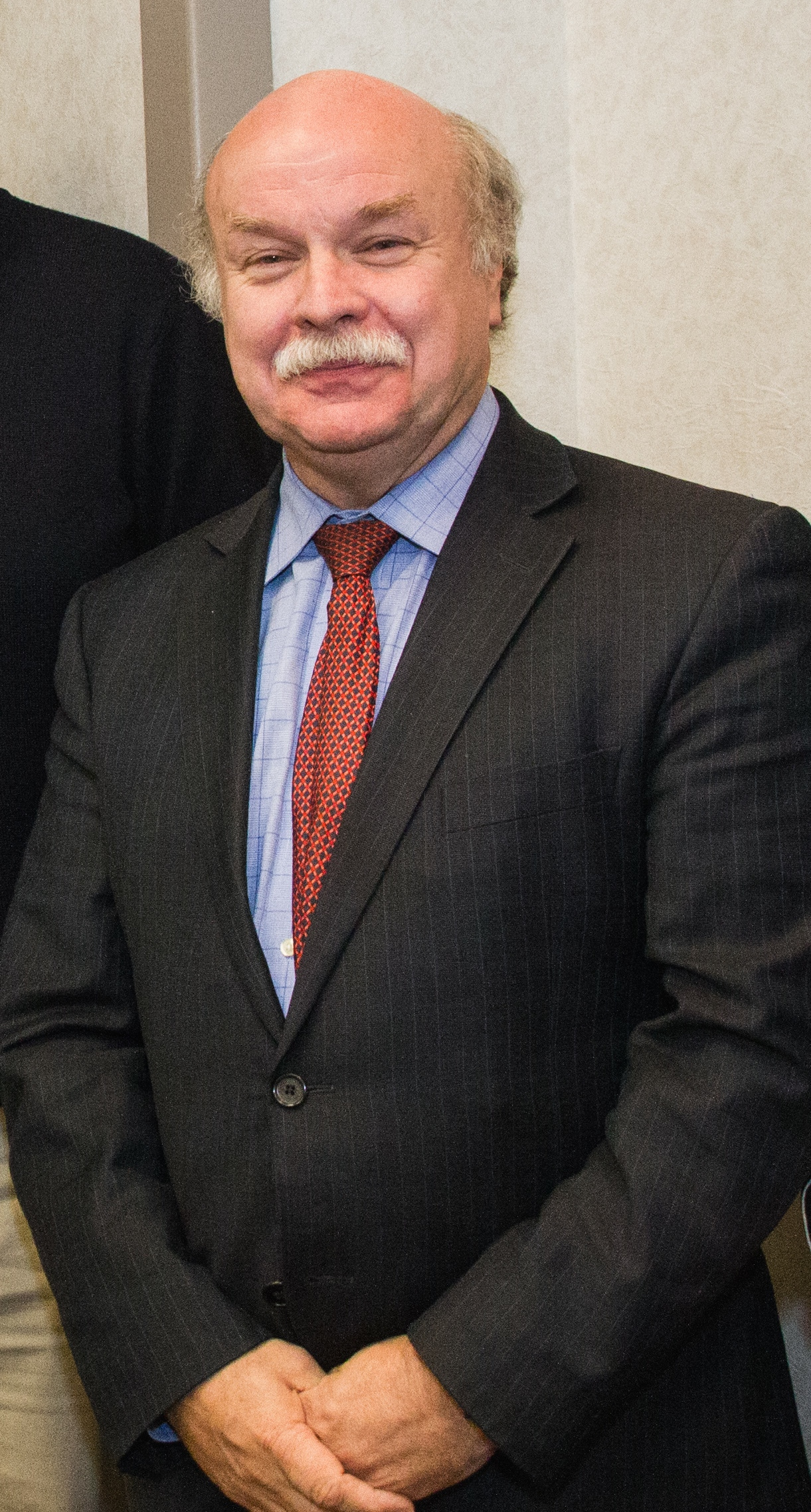
Image of David A. Flockhart

David A. Flockhart (1952–2015) was a Scottish medical researcher who was a leader in the field of personalised medicine. He was especially known for his work on factors affecting the use of tamoxifen to treat breast cancer such as variability in the level of the CYP2D6 enzyme.
