= Tom Flockhart =

Scottish businessman (1949–2022)

Thomas "Tom" Flockhart (12 January 1949 – 24 April 2022) was a Scottish businessman who founded Capital Document. He was also involved in efforts to reform practices in the leasing and public procurement sectors.

== Early life and education ==
Born in Lanark, Scotland, Flockhart was adopted as an infant and raised in Prestonpans, East Lothian. He attended Preston Lodge High School, completed an apprenticeship at the engineering firm Ferranti, and earned a Higher National Diploma (HND) in mechanical engineering.

== Career ==
In 1970, Flockhart began working in sales for 3M, selling photocopiers. He relocated to Aberdeen in 1976 to establish a copier sales division for the offshore oil industry.

In 1979, Flockhart founded his own business, Capital Copying Services, in Edinburgh, financing the company's launch by selling his home. The business was later renamed Capital Document Solutions and expanded to multiple locations across Scotland.

== Advocacy ==
In the 1990s, Flockhart worked with Member of Parliament Nigel Griffiths to address issues in the office equipment leasing sector, which contributed to reforms in leasing regulations. In 2009, he engaged with the Scottish Government on its public procurement framework, which led to changes in the process to improve access for Scottish-based businesses.

Flockhart supported several Scottish arts organizations, including the Scottish Chamber Orchestra, the Royal Scottish National Orchestra, the Edinburgh International Festival, and Scottish Opera. His company received an Arts & Business Scotland award for this support.

== Personal life ==
Flockhart had four children. He died of cancer on 24 April 2022 at the age of 73.
