= William J. Dreyer =

- Born: 1928; Kalamazoo, Michigan, United States
- Died: April 23, 2004 (aged 75–76)
- Education: University of Washington, Reed College
- Scientific career
- Fields: Biochemistry
- Workplaces: National Institutes of Health; California Institute of Technology
- Doctoral students: Leroy Hood

William J. Dreyer, Ph.D. (1928 – April 23, 2004) was a molecular immunologist and California Institute of Technology (Caltech) professor of biology from 1963 to 2004.

He completed his Ph.D. in biochemistry at the University of Washington in 1956. Dreyer then went to work at the National Institutes of Health as a National Polio Foundation postdoctoral and as a research scientist studying the genetic code. While at NIH, he invented machinery for automating biochemical analyses. In 1963, he was appointed professor in biology division of Caltech. He collaborated with J. Claude Bennett researching the genetic coding for protein structure, gene splicing and monoclonal antibodies.

In the mid 1960's, Dreyer and one of his doctoral students, Leroy Hood, began research that would later help to show how genes may be rearranged to diversify antibodies and help in immune system function.

Dreyer developed the automated protein sequencer while he was consulting with the Spinco division of Beckman Instruments and patented it in 1977.

Dreyer died of cancer in 2004.

The automated protein sequencer made it possible to obtain sequence information from very small quantities of protein, which then allowed corresponding genes to be identified in DNA libraries. This technology jump-started the modern-day genetic revolution. It is part of Historical Collections of the National Museum of Health and Medicine in Washington, D.C.
