= Ken Stuart (microbiologist) =

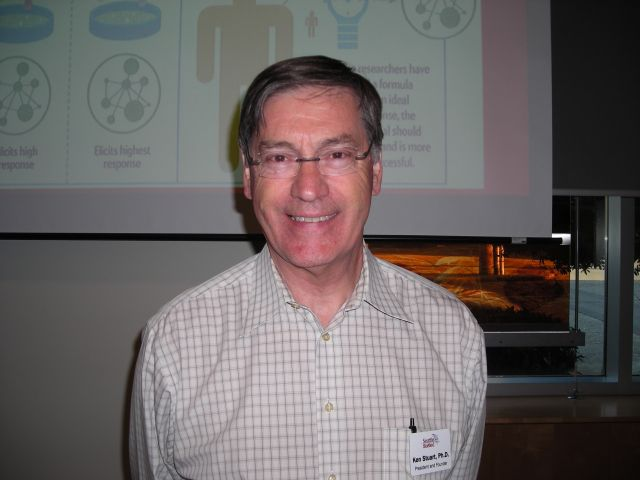
Ken Stuart in May 2011

Ken Stuart is the founder of Center for Global Infectious Disease Research, where he continues scientific research on trypanosomes and malaria. In 2010, Stuart received a grant from the Paul G. Allen Family Foundation to continue his research.
