= International Immunology =

- Discipline: Immunology, allergology
- Language: English
- Edited by: T. Kishimoto

Publication details
- History: 1989-present
- Publisher: Oxford University Press
- Frequency: Monthly
- Impact factor: 3.403 (2009)

Standard abbreviations
- ISO 4: Int. Immunol.

Indexing
- CODEN: INIMEN
- ISSN: 0953-8178 (print); 1460-2377 (web)
- OCLC no.: 20567176

Links
- Journal homepage; Online access; Online archive

International Immunology is a peer-reviewed medical journal published by Oxford University Press on behalf of the Japanese Society for Immunology, addressing studies in allergology and immunology.

== Abstracting and indexing ==
International Immunology is abstracted and indexed in Science Citation Index, Current Contents/Life Sciences, MEDLINE/Index Medicus, EMBASE, and BIOSIS Previews. According to the Journal Citation Reports, its 2009 impact factor is 3.403, ranking it 41 out of 128 journals in the category "Immunology".
