= Systems biomedicine =

Systems biomedicine, also called systems biomedical science, is the application of systems biology to the understanding and modulation of developmental and pathological processes in humans, and in animal and cellular models. Whereas systems biology aims at modeling exhaustive networks of interactions (with the long-term goal of, for example, creating a comprehensive computational model of the cell), mainly at intra-cellular level, systems biomedicine emphasizes the multilevel, hierarchical nature of the models (molecule, organelle, cell, tissue, organ, individual/genotype, environmental factor, population, ecosystem) by discovering and selecting the key factors at each level and integrating them into models that reveal the global, emergent behavior of the biological process under consideration.

Such an approach will be favorable when the execution of all the experiments necessary to establish exhaustive models is limited by time and expense (e.g., in animal models) or basic ethics (e.g., human experimentation).

In the year of 1992, a paper on system biomedicine by Kamada T. was published (Nov.-Dec.), and an article on systems medicine and pharmacology by Zeng B.J. was also published (April) in the same time period. In 2009, the first collective book on systems biomedicine was edited by Edison T. Liu and Douglas A. Lauffenburger.

In October 2008, one of the first research groups uniquely devoted to systems biomedicine was established at the European Institute of Oncology. One of the first research centers specialized on systems biomedicine was founded by Rudi Balling. The Luxembourg Centre for Systems Biomedicine is an interdisciplinary center of the University of Luxembourg. The first centre devoted to spatial issues in systems biomedicine has been recently established at Oregon Health and Science University.

The first peer-reviewed journal on this topic, Systems Biomedicine, was recently established by Landes Bioscience.

== See also ==
- Systems biology
- Systems medicine
