= Charalampos Tzoulis =

Greek neurologist

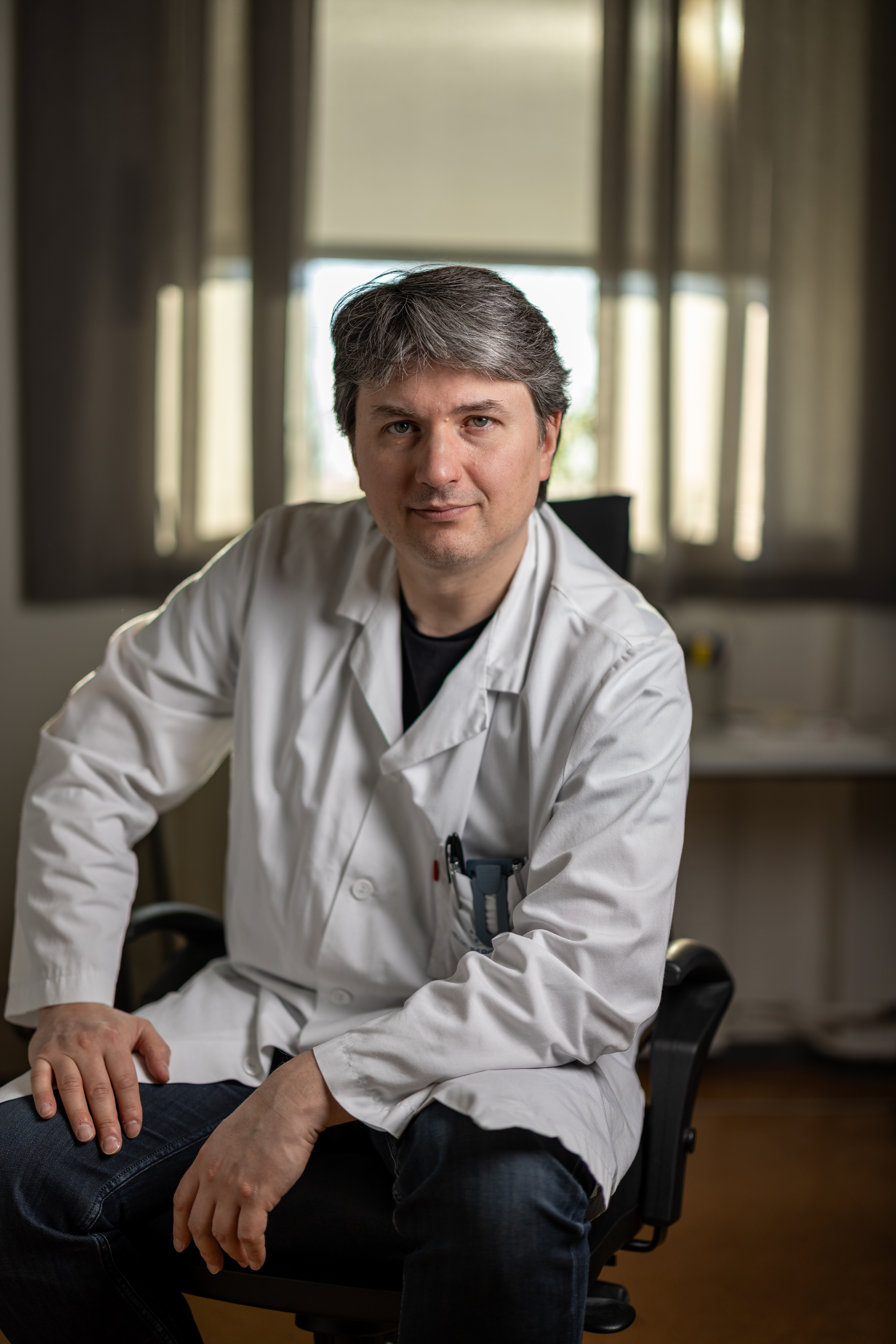
- Born: 27 December 1979 (age 46); Athens, Greece
- Known for: Parkinson's disease research
- Website: www.decode-pd.org

Charalampos (Haris) Tzoulis is an internationally recognized expert in movement disorders and neurodegeneration who has made several scientific contributions, especially in the understanding of mitochondrial dysfunction and NAD metabolism in Parkinson's disease. He is also recognized for his leadership of several national research centers and initiatives focused on prevention, diagnosis, and treatment of neurodegenerative diseases. Beyond his research activities, Tzoulis is actively engaged in public outreach through media appearances, collaborations with patient organizations, and dialogue with policymakers on brain health.

== Education and career ==
Tzoulis was born in Athens, Greece, studied medicine in Szeged, Hungary, and completed his specialization in neurology at Haukeland University Hospital, Bergen, Norway. In 2010 he obtained his PhD at the University of Bergen with the project: "Clinical and Molecular studies of Mitochondrial DNA Polymerase Gamma (POLG) Associated Disease". He is Professor of Neurology and Neurogenetics at the University of Bergen and Senior Consultant of Neurology at the Department of Neurology, Haukeland University Hospital.

== Research ==
Prof. Tzoulis leads the research group "DECODE-PD", a transdisciplinary team of over 40 members focusing on translational and clinical research to develop and test new biomarkers, preventive strategies and treatments for Parkinson's disease and related disorders.

Tzoulis’ work has advanced understanding of mitochondrial dysfunction, bioenergetics, and selective cellular vulnerability in Parkinson’s disease and related α-synucleinopathies. He currently leads a broad translational and clinical research portfolio with a strong focus on biomarker-driven studies and innovative trial design, including the SLEIPNIR and HYDRA multi-arm platform trials in Parkinson’s disease, as well as NOR-RBD, a national initiative aimed at prevention in prodromal synucleinopathies through a cohort of individuals with REM-sleep behavior disorder.

== Research Centers ==
Prof. Tzoulis leads several research centers at the University of Bergen and Haukeland University Hospital dedicated to neurodegenerative diseases. These centers provide platforms for interdisciplinary collaboration between basic scientists, clinicians, and innovation partners, supporting research from discovery to clinical translation.

=== Neuro-SysMed ===
Neuro-SysMed is a Norwegian Center for Clinical Treatment Research funded by the Research Council of Norway. Tzoulis is Center Director and Head of the Parkinson's disease research program. The center conducts clinical research on four neurological disease-groups: Parkinson's disease and related disorders, amyotrophic lateral sclerosis, dementia disorders, including Alzheimer's disease and dementia with Lewy bodies, and multiple sclerosis.

=== K.G. Jebsen Center for Parkinson's Disease ===
The K.G. Jebsen Centre for Parkinson's Disease investigates the mechanisms underlying the initiation and progression of Parkinson's disease and related disorders, with the aim of identifying molecular disease subtypes and developing personalized therapies. The center is funded by the K.G. Jebsen Foundation together with the University of Bergen and is directed by Tzoulis.

=== Mohn Center for Neuroprotection ===
The Mohn Center for Neuroprotection was established in 2025 at the University of Bergen and Haukeland University Hospital. Directed by Tzoulis, the center focuses on preventing neurodegenerative diseases by identifying individuals at high risk before the onset of clinical symptoms, with a particular emphasis on REM sleep behavior disorder (RBD).

=== Innovation Center for Neuroresilience (ICoN) ===
The Innovation Center for Neuroresilience (ICoN) is a Norwegian Centre for Research-based Innovation (SFI) established in 2026. With Tzoulis as center Director, the center brings together academic institutions and industry partners across pharma, biotech, digital health, food, and supplements, to develop technologies and interventions to promote brain resilience and neuroprotection.

== Publication record ==
Tzoulis has led multiple publications in the field of neurodegeneration.

== Selected distinctions and awards ==
- 2026 - Norwegian Brain Council's Research Prize 2026 (Hjernerådets forskningspris 2026)
- 2024 - Member of the International Linked Clinical Trials committee for Parkinson's disease
- 2018 - Falch Research Prize
- 2017 - Career Grant of the Trond Mohn Foundation (2017–2021)
- 2012 - Meltzer Young Researcher Award for outstanding scientific achievements by the University of Bergen in 2012
- 2011 - Forsbergs & Aulies Legacy Grant
