= Kathy Barker =

American writer

Kathy Barker (born 1953) is a scientist/writer who focuses on science management and on communicating science to society. She authored At the Bench, which teaches laboratory practice to graduate students and postdoctoral fellows in the biomedical sciences, and At the Helm, which educates new principal investigators in laboratory management. She received a PhD in Microbiology from the University of Massachusetts Amherst. She was a faculty member in the Cell Physiology and Immunology Department at The Rockefeller University before embarking on her writing career.

Kathy Barker currently explores scientists as activists at her blog, Scientists as Citizens, showing how scientists are using their training to improve the world beyond the bench. Kathy has also written two guides for scientists titled "At the Bench" and "At the Helm".
