= Catherine Barker =

British ice dancer

Catherine Barker is a British ice dancer. She is the former British pairs champion.

== Early life ==
She lived at 16 Fordwell Road in Fairfield, County Durham. In 1995 graduated from University College Stockton
