= Ruedi Aebersold =

Swiss biologist (born 1954)

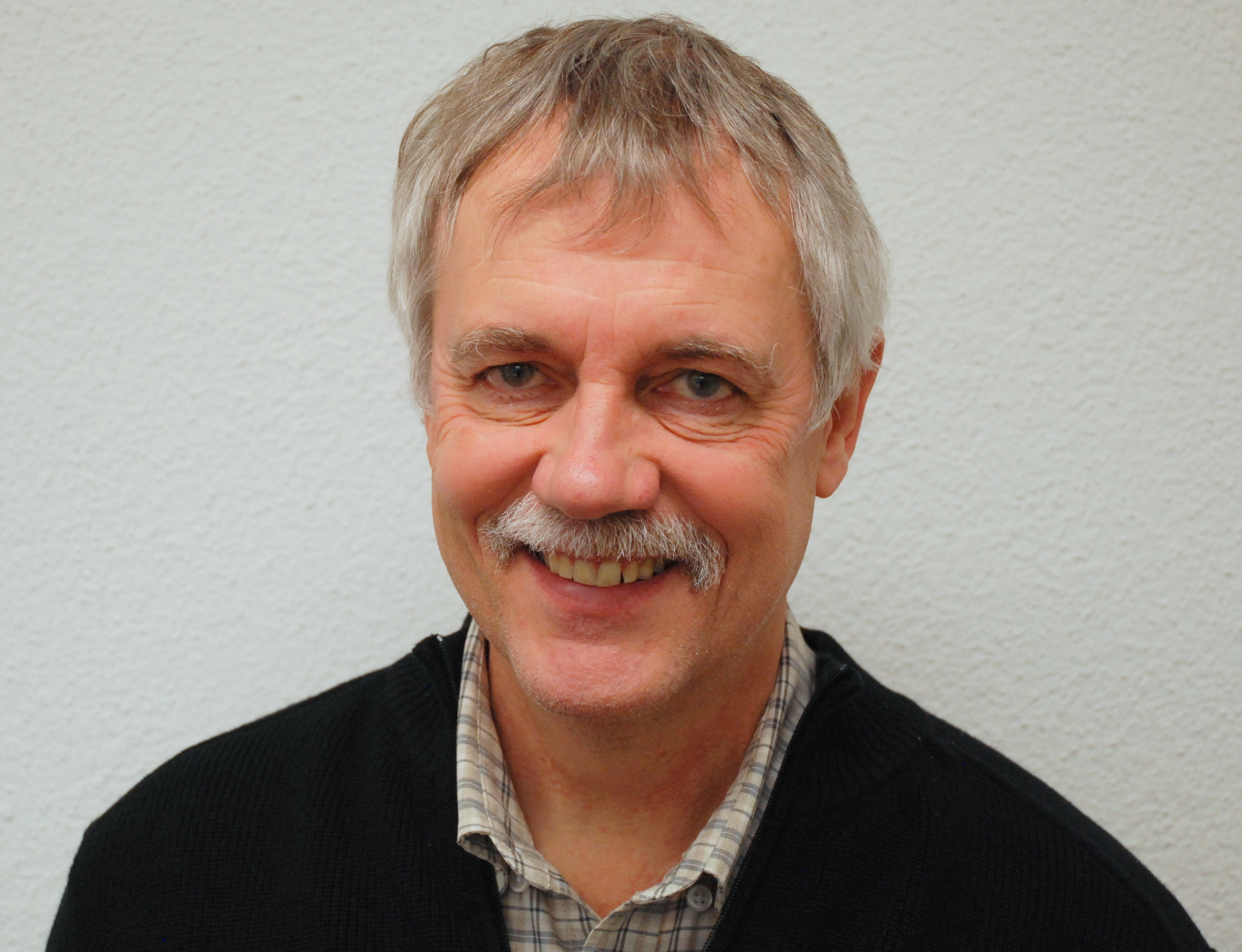
- Born: 12 September 1954 (age 71); Switzerland
- Education: University of Basel
- Scientific career
- Fields: Proteomics
- Institutions: ETH Zurich; Institute for Systems Biology
- Thesis: Structure-function relationships of hybridoma-derived monoclonal antibodies against streptococcal A group polysaccharide (1983)
- Doctoral advisor: Dietmar G. Braun
- Other academic advisors: Leroy Hood

Rudolf Aebersold (better known as Ruedi Aebersold; born 12 September 1954) is a Swiss biologist, regarded as a pioneer in the fields of proteomics and systems biology. He has primarily researched techniques for measuring proteins in complex samples, in many cases via mass spectrometry. Ruedi Aebersold is a professor of Systems biology at the Institute of Molecular Systems Biology (IMSB) in ETH Zurich. He was one of the founders of the Institute for Systems Biology in Seattle, Washington, United States where he previously had a research group.

Aebersold is known for the development and application of targeted proteomics techniques in the field of biomedical research, in order to understand the function, interaction and localization of each protein in the cell and its changes in disease states. To this end, Ruedi Abersold has made significant contributions in the development and application of targeted proteomics methods, including selected reaction monitoring and data-independent acquisition. Ruedi Aebersold is also recognized for its contributions in the development of standard formats and open source software for the analysis and storage of mass spectrometry and proteomics data, and he is one of the inventors of the Isotope-Coded Affinity Tag (ICAT) technique for quantitative proteomics, a technique that measures the relative quantities of proteins between two sample by using tags containing stable isotopes of different masses.

Aebersold is co-founder and scientific advisor of the companies ProteoMediX and Biognosys.

== Honors and awards ==
- 2005 – HUPO Award
- 2006 – Buchner Medal
- 2008 – In recognition of his contribution to the field of protein sciences and proteomics the Association of Biomolecular Resource Facilities (ABRF) selected him for the ABRF 2008 Award.
- 2010 – Herbert A. Sober Lectureship
- 2010 – Otto Naegeli Prize
- 2012 – Thomson Medal Award
- 2014 – he became a member of the German Academy of Sciences Leopoldina.
- 2015 – ranked #1 on the 2015 list of "most influential people in the analytical sciences" (by the Analytical Scientist)
- 2018 – Bijvoet Medal of the Bijvoet Center for Biomolecular Research of Utrecht University
- 2020 – Marcel Benoist Prize
- 2026 – Canada Gairdner International Award
