= Institute for Systems Biology =

American non-profit research institute

- Type: Non-profit
- Industry: Biology
- Founded: 2000
- Founder: Leroy Hood; Alan Aderem; Ruedi Aebersold
- Headquarters: Seattle, Washington, United States
- Area served: Systems Biology
- Key people: James R. Heath, PhD, President and Professor; Leroy Hood, MD, PhD, Professor and Co-founder; Nitin Baliga, PhD, Senior Vice President and Director Mary Brunkow, Ph.D. Nobel Laureate
- Number of employees: 230
- Website: isbscience.org

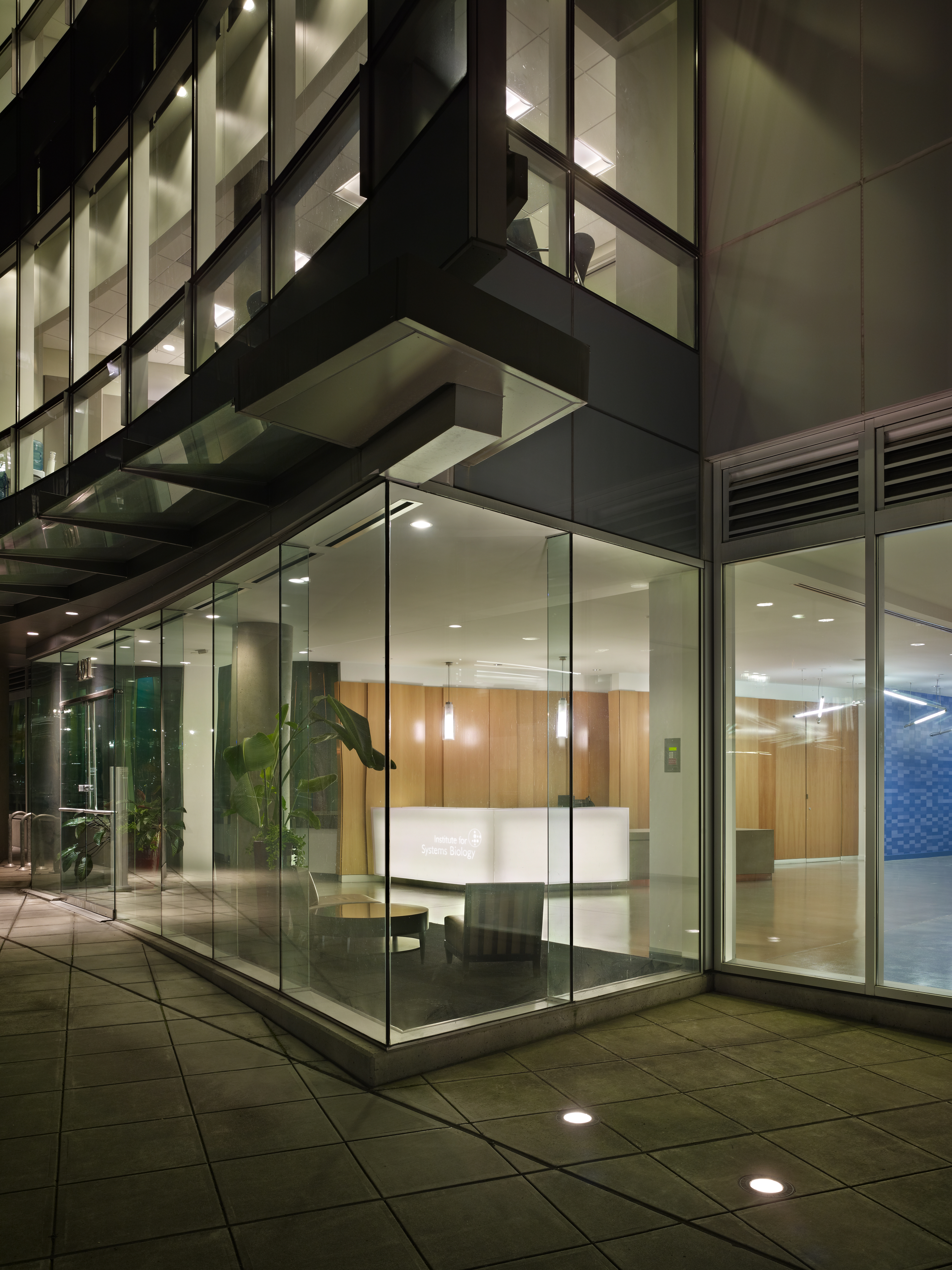
This is the front entrance of Institute for Systems Biology in Seattle's South Lake Union neighborhood at 401 Terry Ave. N.

The Institute for Systems Biology (ISB) is a non-profit research institution located in Seattle, Washington, United States. ISB concentrates on systems biology, the study of relationships and interactions between various parts of biological systems, and advocates an interdisciplinary approach to biological research.

== Goals ==
Systems biology is the study of biological systems in a holistic manner by integrating data at all levels of the biological information hierarchy, from global down to the individual organism, and below down to the molecular level. The vision of ISB is to integrate these concepts using a cross-disciplinary approach combining the efforts of biologists, chemists, computer scientists, engineers, mathematicians, physicists, and physicians.

On its website, ISB has defined four areas of focus:

- P4 Medicine – This acronym refers to predictive, preventive, personalized and participatory medicine, which focuses on wellness rather than mere treatment of disease.
- Global Health – Use of the systems approach towards the study of infectious diseases, vaccine development, emergence of chronic diseases, and maternal and child health.
- Sustainable Environment – Applying systems biology for a better understanding of the role of microbes in the environment and their relation to human health.
- Education & Outreach – Knowledge transfer to society through a variety of educational programs and partnerships, including the spin out of new companies.

== Early history ==
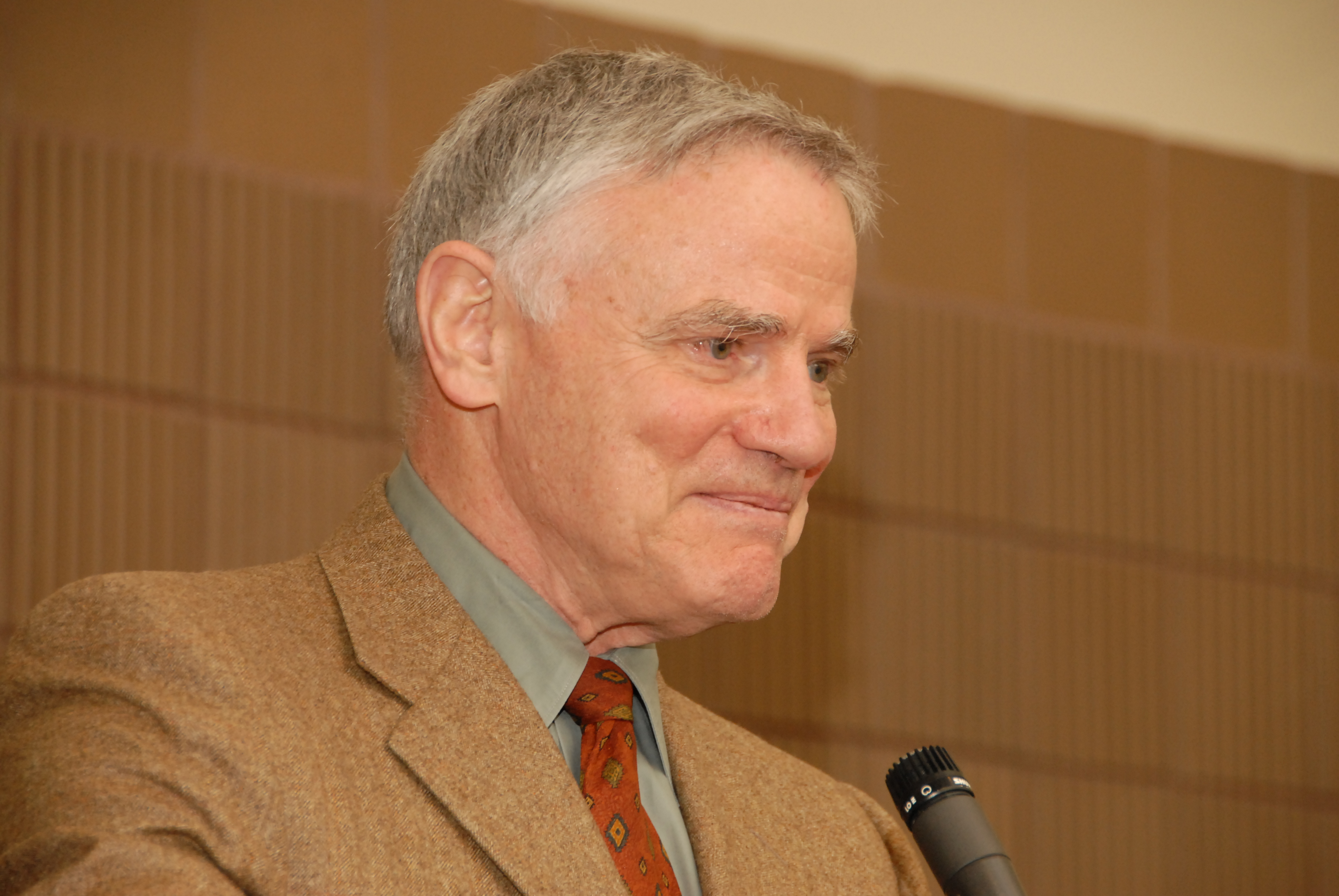
Leroy Hood, 2008

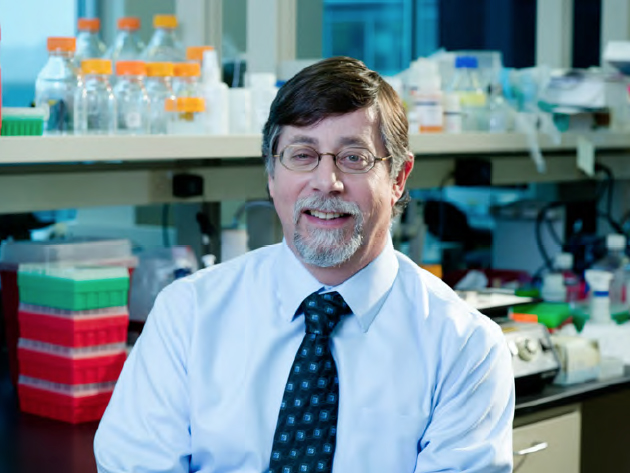
Alan Aderem, 2012

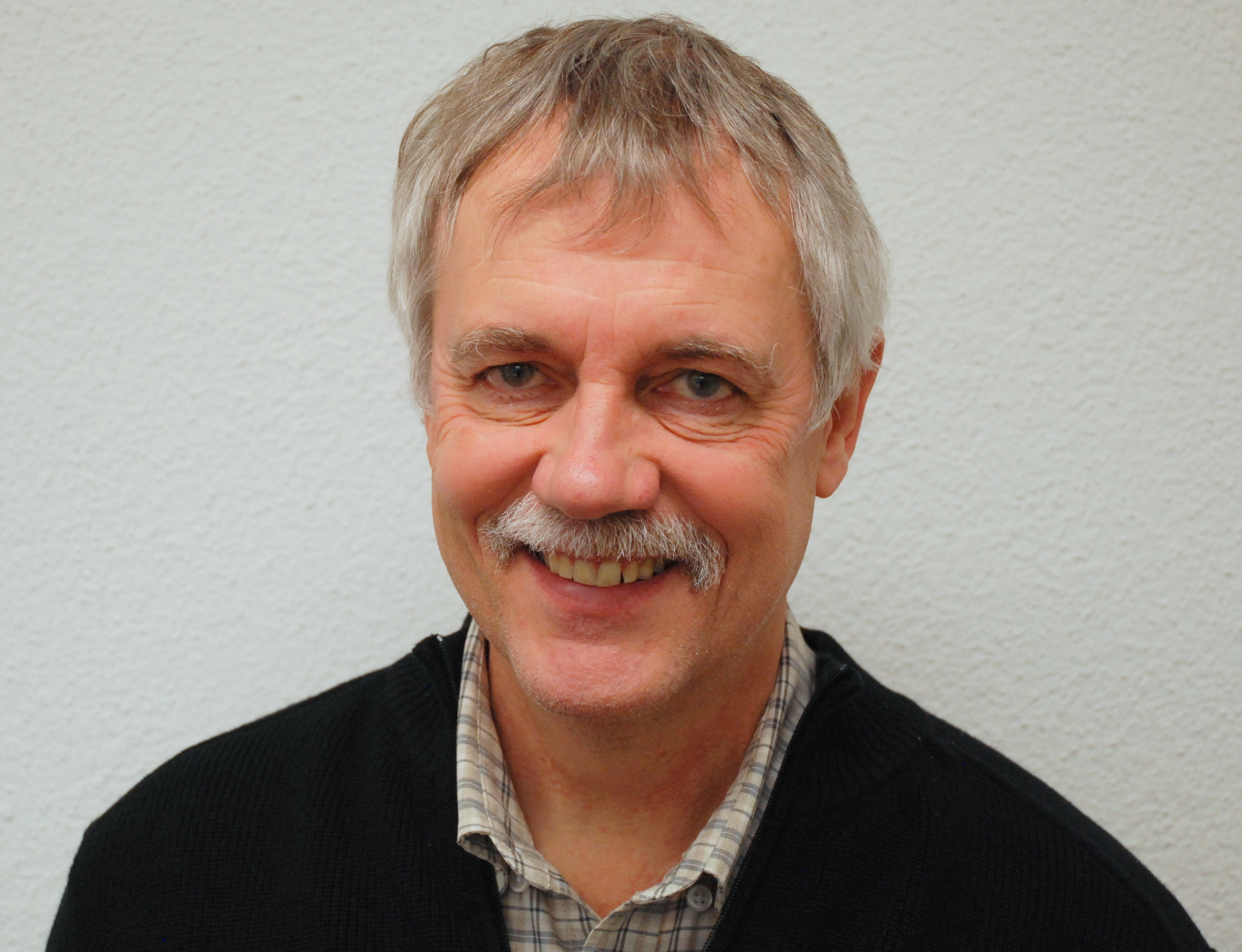
Ruedi Aebersold, 2012

Leroy Hood co-founded the Institute with Alan Aderem and Ruedi Aebersold in 2000.

However, the story of how ISB got started actually begins in 1990. Lee Hood was the director of a large molecular biotechnology lab at the California Institute of Technology in Pasadena, and was a key advisor in the Human Genome Project, having overseen development of machines that were instrumental to its later success. The University of Washington (UW), like many other universities, was eager to recruit Hood, but had neither the space nor the money to accommodate Hood's large laboratory.

Lee Huntsman, director of University of Washington's Center for Bioengineering, was attending a University of Washington football game, sharing a luxury box with Bill Gates, the former CEO and current chairman of Microsoft. Huntsman took the opportunity to tell Gates about Hood. Bill Gates already had a considerable interest in biotechnology, both as a philanthropist and as an investor, and after meeting Hood, donated $12 million to UW to enable him to head a new department of molecular biotechnology, where Hood continues to hold a faculty position as the Gates Professor of Molecular Biotechnology.

ISB represents a spin-off of Hood's labs at UW.

== Achievements ==
ISB is in the top ranks of scientific institutions worldwide. In 2012, the SCImago Research Group, based in Spain, ranked ISB 4th worldwide on its Excellence Rate scale.

ISB currently hosts 12 research groups with expertise ranging across genetics, microbial genetics, complex molecular machines, macromolecular complexes, gene regulatory networks, immunology, molecular and cell biology, cancer biology, genomics, proteomics, protein chemistry, computational biology and biotechnology. The ISB website lists 985 peer-reviewed publications for the years 2000 through early 2012.

In late 2005, ISB began to emphasize the application of systems biology to P4 medicine (predictive, preventive, personalized, participatory), i.e. the development of techniques for predicting and preventing disease, possibly before patients even know they are sick. The P4 Medicine institute was co-founded in 2010 by ISB and Ohio State University.

On December 21, 2012, President Obama awarded 12 scientists, including Dr. Leroy Hood, the National Medal of Science, which the highest honor given by the U.S. government to scientists, engineers and inventors.

In 2025 Dr. Mary Elizabeth Brunkow, a senior program manager at the ISB, was awarded the 2025 Nobel Prize in Physiology or Medicine for fundamental work in peripheral immune tolerance.

The Education and Outreach efforts of ISB include creating the Logan Center for Education whose mission is to enable educators to produce STEM literate students. ISB offers paid research internships for high school and undergraduate students, and offers advanced systems science courses throughout the year.

ISB partnered in several high-profile research projects, the most significant one thus far being with the Grand Duchy of Luxembourg to create the Center for Systems Biology Luxembourg and the Seattle Proteome Center.

ISB faculty members have launched several companies, including: Cytopeia (acquired by BD in 2008), Integrated Diagnostics, Macrogenics, NanoString Technologies, and Accelerator Corporation. Accelerator Corporation, in particular, is an investment company that provides venture capital funding and management for biotech startup companies. Its portfolio companies and graduates have focused on improved biotherapeutics, vaccines, biomarkers and other such products.

== See also ==
- List of systems sciences organizations
