= December 1 =

December 1 this year in various calendars
- Tuesday, 1 December 2026
| Akan | Fobene |
| Armenian | 14 Kʿaloch 1476 |
| Aztec | Tlacaxipehualiztli 20, 1 Ācatl |
| Babylonian | 20 Arakhsamna, 2337 SE |
| Balinese pawukon | Menga, Pasah, Jaya, Paing, Tungleh, Anggara of Taulu, Kala, Dangu, Suka |
| Bengali | 16 Ogrohayon, BS 1433 |
| Chinese | Yin Earth Rooster・Turtle Beak Mansion; Fire Horse Year, Month 10, Day 23 (Xiaoxue, 6 days until Daxue) |
| Common Era | 1 December 2026 CE |
| Coptic | 22 Hathor, AM 1743 |
| Egyptian | 19 Pharmuthi, 2775 NE |
| Ethiopian | 22 H̱edār, 2019 Amätä Məhrät |
| French Republican | Décade I, Décadi de Frimaire de l'Année 235 de la République |
| Gregorian | 1 December, AD 2026 |
| Hebrew | 21 Kislev, AM 5787 |
| Hindu | Maghā・Vaidhṛti; Solar: 15 Mārgaśīrṣa, 1948 SE; Lunisolar: Aṣṭamī, Kṛishna pakṣa of Kārtika, 2083 VE; Rāudra・5127 KY・1,872,910 |
| Icelandic | Þriðjudagur, 9 Ýlir 2026 |
| Islamic | 20 Jumada al-thani, AH 1448 (using tabular method) |
| ISO week date | 2026-W49-2 |
| Japanese | 23 Kannazuki, Reiwa 8 (Shōsetsu, 6 days until Taisetsu) |
| Julian | 18 November, AD 2026 (AM 7535) |
| Julian day | 2461376 |
| Korean | 23 Dwaejidal, 4359 DE |
| Maya | 13.0.14.2.13; 6 Mac, 1 Ben |
| Roman | ante diem XIV Kalendas Decembres, MMDCCLXXIX AUC |
| Solar Hijri | 10 Azar, SH 1405 |
| Tibetan | 23 smin drug, me pho rta 2153 or 1772 or 1000 |

| << | December | | | | | >> |
| Su | Mo | Tu | We | Th | Fr | Sa |
| | | 1 | 2 | 3 | 4 | 5 |
| 6 | 7 | 8 | 9 | 10 | 11 | 12 |
| 13 | 14 | 15 | 16 | 17 | 18 | 19 |
| 20 | 21 | 22 | 23 | 24 | 25 | 26 |
| 27 | 28 | 29 | 30 | 31 |
2026

December 1 in recent years
2025 (Monday)
2024 (Sunday)
2023 (Friday)
2022 (Thursday)
2021 (Wednesday)
2020 (Tuesday)
2019 (Sunday)
2018 (Saturday)
2017 (Friday)
2016 (Thursday)

December 1 is the 335th day of the year (336th in leap years) in the Gregorian calendar; 30 days remain until the end of the year.

== Events ==
=== Pre-1600 ===
- 800 – A council is convened in the Vatican, at which Charlemagne is to judge the accusations against Pope Leo III.
- 1420 – Henry V of England enters Paris alongside his father-in-law King Charles VI of France.
- 1577 – English Courtiers Christopher Hatton and Thomas Heneage are knighted by Queen Elizabeth I.

=== 1601–1900 ===
- 1640 – End of the Iberian Union: Portugal acclaims as King João IV of Portugal, ending 59 years of personal union of the crowns of Portugal and Spain and the end of the rule of the Philippine Dynasty.
- 1662 – Diarist John Evelyn records skating on the frozen lake in St James's Park, London, watched by Charles II and Queen Catherine.
- 1768 – The slave ship Fredensborg sinks off Tromøya in Norway.
- 1821 – José Núñez de Cáceres wins the independence of the Dominican Republic from Spain and names the new territory the Republic of Spanish Haiti.
- 1822 – Pedro I is crowned Emperor of Brazil.
- 1824 – United States presidential election: Since no candidate received a majority of the total electoral college votes in the election, the United States House of Representatives is given the task of deciding the winner in accordance with the Twelfth Amendment to the United States Constitution.
- 1828 – Argentine general Juan Lavalle makes a coup against governor Manuel Dorrego, beginning the Decembrist revolution.
- 1834 – Slavery is abolished in the Cape Colony in accordance with the Slavery Abolition Act 1833.
- 1862 – American Civil War: In his second State of the Union Address, President Abraham Lincoln reaffirms the necessity of ending slavery as ordered ten weeks earlier in the Emancipation Proclamation.
- 1865 – Shaw University, the first historically black university in the southern United States, is founded in Raleigh, North Carolina.
- 1878 – President Rutherford B. Hayes gets the first telephone installed in the White House.
- 1900 – Nicaragua sells canal rights to U.S. for $5 million. The canal agreement fails in March 1901. Great Britain rejects the amended treaty.

=== 1901–present ===
- 1913 – The Buenos Aires Metro, the first underground railway system in the Southern Hemisphere and in Latin America, begins operation.
- 1913 – Crete, having obtained self rule from Turkey after the First Balkan War, is annexed by Greece.
- 1916 – An armed confrontation in Athens between the Kingdom of Greece and the Allied Powers, arising from a dispute over Greece's neutrality in World War I, followed by reprisals and riots against Greek supporters of the Allies marking the height of the National Schism.
- 1918 – Transylvania unites with Romania, following the incorporation of Bessarabia (March 27) and Bukovina (November 28) and thus concluding the Great Union.
- 1918 – Iceland becomes a sovereign state, yet remains a part of the Danish kingdom.
- 1918 – The Kingdom of Serbs, Croats and Slovenes (later known as the Kingdom of Yugoslavia) is proclaimed.
- 1919 – Lady Astor becomes the first female Member of Parliament (MP) to take her seat in the House of Commons of the United Kingdom. (She had been elected to that position on November 28.)
- 1924 – The National Hockey League's first United States–based franchise, the Boston Bruins, plays their first game in league play at home, at the still-extant Boston Arena indoor hockey facility.
- 1924 – A Soviet-backed communist 1924 Estonian coup d'état attempt fails in Estonia.
- 1934 – Sergei Kirov is assassinated, paving way for the repressive Great Purge, and Vinnytsia massacre by General Secretary of the Communist Party of the Soviet Union, Joseph Stalin.
- 1939 – World War II: A day after the beginning of the Winter War in Finland, the Cajander III Cabinet resigns and is replaced by the Ryti I Cabinet, while the Finnish Parliament move from Helsinki to Kauhajoki to escape the Soviet airstrikes.
- 1939 – The Soviet Union establishes the Finnish Democratic Republic puppet state in Terijoki.
- 1941 – World War II: Emperor Hirohito of Japan gives his tacit approval to the decision of the imperial council to initiate war against the United States.
- 1941 – World War II: Fiorello La Guardia, Mayor of New York City and Director of the Office of Civilian Defense, signs Administrative Order 9, creating the Civil Air Patrol.
- 1952 – The New York Daily News reports the news of Christine Jorgensen, the first notable case of sex reassignment surgery.
- 1955 – American Civil Rights Movement: In Montgomery, Alabama, seamstress Rosa Parks refuses to give up her bus seat to a white man and is arrested for violating the city's racial segregation laws, an incident which leads to that city's bus boycott.
- 1958 – The Central African Republic attains self-rule within the French Union.
- 1958 – The Our Lady of the Angels School fire in Chicago kills 92 children and three nuns.
- 1959 – Cold War: Opening date for signature of the Antarctic Treaty, which sets aside Antarctica as a scientific preserve and bans military activity on the continent.
- 1960 – Patrice Lumumba is arrested by Mobutu Sese Seko's men on the banks of the Sankuru River, for inciting the army to rebellion.
- 1963 – Nagaland, became the 16th state of India.
- 1964 – Vietnam War: U.S. President Lyndon B. Johnson and his top-ranking advisers meet to discuss plans to bomb North Vietnam.
- 1969 – Vietnam War: The first draft lottery in the United States is held since World War II.
- 1971 – Cambodian Civil War: Khmer Rouge rebels intensify assaults on Cambodian government positions, forcing their retreat from Kompong Thmar and nearby Ba Ray.
- 1971 – Purge of Croatian Spring leaders starts in Yugoslavia at the meeting of the League of Communists at the Karađorđevo estate.
- 1973 – Papua New Guinea gains self-government from Australia.
- 1974 – TWA Flight 514, a Boeing 727, crashes northwest of Dulles International Airport, killing all 92 people on board.
- 1974 – Northwest Orient Airlines Flight 6231, another Boeing 727, crashes northwest of John F. Kennedy International Airport.
- 1981 – Inex-Adria Aviopromet Flight 1308, a McDonnell Douglas MD-80, crashes in Corsica, killing all 180 people on board.
- 1984 – NASA conducts the Controlled Impact Demonstration, wherein an airliner is deliberately crashed in order to test technologies and gather data to help improve survivability of crashes.
- 1988 – World AIDS Day is proclaimed worldwide by the UN member states.
- 1988 – Benazir Bhutto, is named as the Prime Minister of Pakistan, becoming the first female leader to lead a Muslim nation.
- 1989 – Philippine coup attempt: The right-wing military rebel Reform the Armed Forces Movement attempts to oust Philippine President Corazon Aquino in a failed bloody coup d'état.
- 1989 – Cold War: East Germany's parliament abolishes the constitutional provision granting the Communist Party the leading role in the state.
- 1990 – Channel Tunnel sections started from the United Kingdom and France meet beneath the seabed.
- 1991 – Cold War: Ukrainian voters overwhelmingly approve a referendum for independence from the Soviet Union.
- 1997 – In the Indian state of Bihar, Ranvir Sena attacks the CPI (ML) Party Unity stronghold Lakshmanpur-Bathe, killing 63 lower-caste people.
- 1997 – Fourteen-year-old Michael Carneal opens fire at a group of students in Heath High School in West Paducah, Kentucky, killing three and injuring five.
- 2000 – Vicente Fox Quesada is inaugurated as the president of Mexico, marking the first peaceful transfer of executive federal power to an opposing political party following a free and democratic election in Mexico's history.
- 2001 – The United Russia political party was founded.
- 2005 – As a result of the merger of the Perm Oblast and the Komi-Permyak Autonomous Okrug, a new subject of the Russian Federation, the Perm Krai, was created.
- 2006 – The law on same-sex marriage comes into force in South Africa, legalizing same-sex marriage for the first time on the African continent.
- 2009 – The Treaty of Lisbon entered into force in the European Union.
- 2011 – The Alma-Ata Metro was opened.
- 2018 – The Oulu Police informed the public about the first offence of the much larger child sexual exploitation in Oulu, Finland.
- 2019 – Arsenal Women 11–1 Bristol City Women breaks the record for most goals scored in a FA Women's Super League match, with Vivianne Miedema involved in ten of the eleven Arsenal goals.
- 2019 – The outbreak of coronavirus infection begins in Wuhan.
- 2020 – The Arecibo Telescope collapses.

== Births ==
=== Pre-1600 ===
- 624 – Hasan ibn Ali, the second Shia Imam (died 670)
- 1081 – Louis VI, French king (died 1137)
- 1083 – Anna Komnene, Byzantine medical doctor and scholar (died 1153)
- 1415 – Jan Długosz, Polish historian (died 1480)
- 1438 – Peter II, Duke of Bourbon, son of Charles I (died 1503)
- 1443 – Magdalena of France, French princess (died 1495)
- 1521 – Takeda Shingen, Japanese daimyō (died 1573)
- 1525 – Tadeáš Hájek, Czech medical doctor and astronomer (died 1600)
- 1530 – Bernardino Realino, Italian Jesuit (died 1616)
- 1561 – Sophie Hedwig of Brunswick-Wolfenbüttel, Duchess consort of Pomerania-Wolgast (died 1631)
- 1580 – Nicolas-Claude Fabri de Peiresc, French astronomer and historian (died 1637)

=== 1601–1900 ===
- 1690 – Philip Yorke, 1st Earl of Hardwicke, English lawyer and politician, Lord Chancellor of the United Kingdom (died 1764)
- 1709 – Franz Xaver Richter, Czech composer, violinist, and conductor (died 1789)
- 1716 – Étienne Maurice Falconet, French sculptor (died 1791)
- 1743 – Martin Heinrich Klaproth, German chemist and academic (died 1817)
- 1761 – Marie Tussaud, French-English sculptor, founded Madame Tussauds Wax Museum (died 1850)
- 1792 – Nikolai Lobachevsky, Russian mathematician and geometer (died 1856)
- 1800 – Mihály Vörösmarty, Hungarian poet (died 1855)
- 1805 – 9th Dalai Lama, Tibetan Buddhist spiritual leader (died 1815)
- 1844 – Alexandra of Denmark, Queen Consort of Edward VII of the United Kingdom, Empress Consort of India (died 1925)
- 1846 – Ledi Sayadaw, Burmese monk and philosopher (died 1923)
- 1847 – Julia A. Moore, American poet (died 1920)
- 1855 – John Evans, English-Australian politician, 21st Premier of Tasmania (died 1943)
- 1869 – Eligiusz Niewiadomski, Polish painter and critic (died 1923)
- 1871 – Archie MacLaren, English cricketer (died 1944)
- 1883 – Henry Cadbury, American historian, scholar, and academic (died 1974)
- 1884 – Karl Schmidt-Rottluff, German painter and etcher (died 1976)
- 1886 – Rex Stout, American detective novelist (died 1975)
- 1886 – Zhu De, Chinese general and politician, 1st Vice Chairman of the People's Republic of China (died 1976)
- 1894 – Afrânio Pompílio Gastos do Amaral, Brazilian herpetologist (died 1982)
- 1895 – Henry Williamson, English farmer, soldier, and author (died 1977)
- 1896 – Georgy Zhukov, Russian general and politician, 2nd Minister of Defence for the Soviet Union (died 1974)
- 1898 – Stuart Garson, Canadian lawyer and politician, 12th Premier of Manitoba (died 1977)
- 1898 – Cyril Ritchard, Australian-American actor and singer (died 1977)
- 1900 – Karna Maria Birmingham, Australian artist, illustrator and print maker (died 1987)

=== 1901–present ===
- 1901 – Ilona Fehér, Hungarian-Israeli violinist and educator (died 1988)
- 1903 – Nikolai Voznesensky, Soviet economic planner, member of the Politburo of the Central Committee of the Communist Party of the Soviet Union (died 1950)
- 1905 – Alex Wilson, Canadian sprinter and coach (died 1994)
- 1910 – Alicia Markova, English ballerina and choreographer (died 2004)
- 1911 – Walter Alston, American baseball player and manager (died 1984)
- 1911 – Calvin Griffith, Canadian-American businessman (died 1999)
- 1912 – Billy Raimondi, American baseball player (died 2010)
- 1912 – Minoru Yamasaki, American architect, designed the World Trade Center (died 1986)
- 1913 – Mary Martin, American actress and singer (died 1990)
- 1916 – Wan Li, Chinese educator and politician, 4th Vice Premier of the People's Republic of China (died 2015)
- 1917 – Marty Marion, American baseball player and manager (died 2011)
- 1920 – Peter Baptist Tadamaro Ishigami, Japanese priest, 1st Bishop of Naha (died 2014)
- 1922 – Vsevolod Bobrov, Russian ice hockey player, footballer, and manager (died 1979)
- 1923 – Dick Shawn, American actor (died 1987)
- 1923 – Stansfield Turner, American admiral and academic, 12th Director of Central Intelligence (died 2018)
- 1924 – Masao Horiba, Japanese businessman, founded Horiba (died 2015)
- 1925 – Martin Rodbell, American biochemist and endocrinologist, Nobel Prize laureate (died 1998)
- 1926 – Mother Antonia, American-Mexican nun and activist (died 2013)
- 1926 – Allyn Ann McLerie, Canadian-American actress, singer, and dancer (died 2018)
- 1926 – Keith Michell, Australian actor (died 2015)
- 1927 – Micheline Bernardini, French dancer and model
- 1928 – Malachi Throne, American actor (died 2013)
- 1929 – David Doyle, American actor (died 1997)
- 1930 – Marie Bashir, Australian psychiatrist, academic, and politician, 37th Governor of New South Wales (died 2026)
- 1930 – Joachim Hoffmann, German historian and author (died 2002)
- 1931 – George Maxwell Richards, Trinidadian politician, 4th President of Trinidad and Tobago (died 2018)
- 1933 – Lou Rawls, American singer-songwriter, producer, and actor (died 2006)
- 1933 – Violette Verdy, French ballerina (died 2016)
- 1934 – Billy Paul, American soul singer (died 2016)
- 1935 – Sola Sierra, Chilean human rights activist (died 1999)
- 1936 – Igor Rodionov, Russian general and politician, 3rd Russian Minister of Defence (died 2014)
- 1937 – Muriel Costa-Greenspon, American soprano and actress (died 2005)
- 1937 – Gordon Crosse, English composer and academic (died 2021)
- 1937 – Vaira Vīķe-Freiberga, Latvian psychologist and politician, President of Latvia
- 1938 – Sandy Nelson, American rock and roll drummer (died 2022)
- 1939 – Lee Trevino, American golfer and sportscaster
- 1940 – Mike Denness, Scottish cricketer and referee (died 2013)
- 1940 – Jerry Lawson, American electronic engineer and inventor (died 2011)
- 1940 – Richard Pryor, American comedian, actor, producer, and screenwriter (died 2005)
- 1942 – Mohamed Kamel Amr, Egyptian politician, Egyptian Minister of Foreign Affairs
- 1942 – John Crowley, American author and academic
- 1942 – Ross Edwards, Australian cricketer
- 1943 – Kenny Moore, American runner and journalist (died 2022)
- 1944 – Eric Bloom, American singer-songwriter and guitarist
- 1944 – John Densmore, American drummer and songwriter
- 1944 – Tahar Ben Jelloun, Moroccan author and poet
- 1945 – Ásta B. Þorsteinsdóttir, Icelandic politician
- 1945 – Lyle Bien, American vice admiral in the United States Navy
- 1945 – Bette Midler, American singer-songwriter, actress and producer
- 1946 – Jonathan Katz, American comedian and actor
- 1946 – Kemal Kurspahić, Bosnian journalist and author (died 2021)
- 1946 – Gilbert O'Sullivan, Irish singer-songwriter and pianist
- 1947 – Alain Bashung, French singer-songwriter and actor (died 2009)
- 1947 – Bob Fulton, English-Australian rugby league player, coach, and sportscaster (died 2021)
- 1948 – Geraint Davies, Welsh politician
- 1948 – George Foster, American baseball player and radio host
- 1948 – Sarfraz Nawaz, Pakistani cricketer and politician
- 1948 – John Roskelley, American mountaineer and author
- 1948 – Neil Warnock, English footballer and manager
- 1948 – N. T. Wright, English bishop and scholar
- 1948 – Patrick Ibrahim Yakowa, Nigerian civil servant and politician, Governor of Kaduna State (died 2012)
- 1949 – Pablo Escobar, Colombian drug lord and narcoterrorist (died 1993)
- 1949 – Sebastián Piñera, Chilean businessman and politician, 35th President of Chile (died 2024)
- 1950 – Manju Bansal, Indian biologist and academic
- 1950 – Ross Hannaford, Australian singer-songwriter and guitarist (died 2016)
- 1950 – Filippos Petsalnikos, Greek lawyer and politician, Greek Minister of Justice (died 2020)
- 1951 – Aleksandr Panayotov Aleksandrov, Bulgarian cosmonaut
- 1951 – Obba Babatundé, American actor, director, and producer
- 1951 – Jaco Pastorius, American bass player, songwriter, and producer (died 1987)
- 1951 – Nozipho Schroeder, South African lawn bowler
- 1951 – Treat Williams, American actor (died 2023)
- 1952 – Stephen Poliakoff, English director, producer, and playwright
- 1952 – Rick Scott, American politician and businessman
- 1954 – Judith Hackitt, English chemist and engineer
- 1954 – François Van der Elst, Belgian footballer (died 2017)
- 1955 – Veikko Aaltonen, Finnish actor, director, and screenwriter
- 1955 – Verónica Forqué, Spanish actress (died 2021)
- 1955 – Udit Narayan, Indian playback singer
- 1955 – Pat Spillane, Irish footballer and sportscaster
- 1956 – Julee Cruise, American singer-songwriter, musician, and actress (died 2022)
- 1957 – Chris Poland, American guitarist and songwriter
- 1957 – Deep Roy, Kenyan-British actor
- 1957 – Vesta Williams, American singer-songwriter and actress (died 2011)
- 1958 – Javier Aguirre, Mexican footballer and manager
- 1958 – Candace Bushnell, American journalist and author
- 1958 – Alberto Cova, Italian runner
- 1958 – Gary Peters, American politician
- 1958 – Charlene Tilton, American actress and singer
- 1959 – Wally Lewis, Australian rugby league player, coach, and sportscaster
- 1960 – Carol Alt, American model and actress
- 1960 – Jane Turner, Australian actress and producer
- 1961 – Safra Catz, Israeli-American businesswoman and boss of Oracle
- 1961 – Raymond E. Goldstein, American biophysicist and academic
- 1961 – Jeremy Northam, English actor
- 1962 – Sylvie Daigle, Canadian speed skater
- 1962 – Pamela McGee, American basketball player and coach
- 1963 – Marco Greco, Brazilian race car driver
- 1963 – Nathalie Lambert, Canadian speed skater
- 1963 – Arjuna Ranatunga, Sri Lankan cricketer and politician
- 1964 – Salvatore Schillaci, Italian footballer (died 2024)
- 1964 – Jo Walton, Welsh-Canadian author and poet
- 1965 – Henry Honiball, South African rugby player
- 1965 – Magnifico, Slovenian singer
- 1966 – Andrew Adamson, New Zealand director, producer, and screenwriter
- 1966 – Katherine LaNasa, American actress, ballet dancer, and choreographer
- 1966 – Larry Walker, Canadian baseball player and coach
- 1967 – Nestor Carbonell, American actor
- 1967 – Reggie Sanders, American baseball player
- 1968 – Justin Chadwick, English actor and director
- 1968 – Sarah Fitzgerald, Australian squash player
- 1968 – Anders Holmertz, Swedish swimmer
- 1969 – Richard Carrier, American author and blogger
- 1970 – Golden Brooks, American actress
- 1970 – Jonathan Coulton, American singer-songwriter and guitarist
- 1970 – Kirk Rueter, American baseball player
- 1970 – Sarah Silverman, American comedian, actress, and singer
- 1970 – Tisha Waller, American high jumper and educator
- 1971 – Christian Pescatori, Italian race car driver
- 1971 – Mika Pohjola, Finnish-American pianist and composer
- 1971 – John Schlimm, American author and educator
- 1972 – Stanton Barrett, American race car driver and stuntman
- 1972 – Bart Millard, American singer-songwriter
- 1973 – Steve Gibb, English singer-songwriter and guitarist
- 1974 – Costinha, Portuguese footballer and manager
- 1975 – Matt Fraction, American author
- 1975 – Isaiah "Ikey" Owens, American keyboard player and producer (died 2014)
- 1975 – Thomas Schie, Norwegian racing driver and sportscaster
- 1975 – Farah Shah, Pakistani actress and host
- 1975 – Sophia Skou, Danish swimmer
- 1976 – Tomasz Adamek, Polish boxer
- 1976 – Laura Ling, American journalist and author
- 1976 – Dean O'Gorman, New Zealand actor, artist, and photographer
- 1976 – Matthew Shepard, American hate crime victim (died 1998)
- 1976 – Evangelos Sklavos, Greek basketball player
- 1977 – Brad Delson, American guitarist and producer
- 1977 – Sophie Guillemin, French actress
- 1977 – Lee McKenzie, Scottish journalist
- 1977 – Nate Torrence, American actor and comedian
- 1978 – Mat Kearney, American musician
- 1979 – Stephanie Brown Trafton, American discus thrower
- 1979 – Ryan Malone, American ice hockey player
- 1979 – Richard James, Jamaican sprinter
- 1980 – Iftikhar Anjum, Pakistani cricketer
- 1980 – Mohammad Kaif, Indian cricketer and politician
- 1980 – Mubarak Hassan Shami, Kenyan-Qatari runner
- 1980 – Gianna Terzi, Greek singer
- 1981 – Park Hyo-shin, South Korean singer-songwriter and actor
- 1981 – I Made Wirawan, Indonesian footballer
- 1982 – Riz Ahmed, English actor and rapper
- 1982 – Christos Kalantzis, Greek footballer
- 1982 – Christos Melissis, Greek footballer
- 1984 – Charles Michael Davis, American actor
- 1984 – Yolandi Visser, South African rapper and actress
- 1985 – Philip DeFranco, American media host and YouTube personality
- 1985 – Ilfenesh Hadera, American actress
- 1985 – Janelle Monáe, American singer-songwriter, producer, and actress
- 1985 – Emiliano Viviano, Italian footballer
- 1986 – DeSean Jackson, American football player
- 1987 – Tabarie Henry, Virgin Islander sprinter
- 1987 – Vance Joy, Australian singer-songwriter
- 1988 – Tyler Joseph, American musician and singer
- 1988 – Zoë Kravitz, American actress, singer, and model
- 1988 – Dan Mavraides, Greek-American basketball player
- 1988 – Michael Raffl, Austrian ice hockey player
- 1989 – Sotelúm, Mexican trumpet player, composer, and producer
- 1990 – Tomáš Tatar, Slovak ice hockey player
- 1991 – Rakeem Christmas, American basketball player
- 1991 – Hilda Melander, Swedish tennis player
- 1991 – Sun Yang, Chinese swimmer
- 1992 – Masahudu Alhassan, Ghanaian footballer
- 1992 – Javier Báez, Puerto Rican baseball player
- 1992 – Linos Chrysikopoulos, Greek basketball player
- 1992 – Gary Payton II, American basketball player
- 1992 – Marco van Ginkel, Dutch footballer
- 1993 – Beau Webster, Australian cricketer
- 1994 – Seedy Njie, English footballer
- 1995 – Agnė Čepelytė, Lithuanian tennis player
- 1995 – Jenna Fife, Scottish footballer
- 1995 – James Wilson, English footballer
- 1997 – Sada Williams, Barbadian sprinter
- 1997 – Jung Chae-yeon, South Korean actress and singer
- 1999 – Lloyd Pope, Australian cricketer
- 1999 – Nico Schlotterbeck, German footballer
- 2001 – Carole Monnet, French tennis player
- 2003 – Robert Irwin, Australian conservationist and television personality
- 2008 – Ella Gross, American singer, model and actress

== Deaths ==
=== Pre-1600 ===
- 217 – Yehudah HaNasi, 'Nasi', Rabbi and editor of the Mishnah (born 135)
- 660 – Eligius, Frankish bishop and saint (born 588)
- 948 – Gao Conghui, Chinese governor and prince (born 891)
- 969 – Fujiwara no Morotada, Japanese statesman (born 920)
- 1018 – Thietmar of Merseburg, German bishop (born 975)
- 1135 – Henry I, king of England (born 1068)
- 1241 – Isabella of England, Holy Roman Empress (born 1214)
- 1255 – Muhammad III of Alamut, Nizari Ismaili Imam
- 1335 – Abu Sa'id Bahadur Khan, Mongol ruler of the Ilkhanate (born 1305)
- 1374 – Magnus Eriksson, king of Sweden (born 1316)
- 1433 – Go-Komatsu, emperor of Japan (born 1377)
- 1455 – Lorenzo Ghiberti, Italian goldsmith and sculptor (born 1378)
- 1521 – Leo X, pope of the Catholic Church (born 1475)
- 1530 – Margaret of Austria, duchess of Savoy (born 1480)
- 1580 – Giovanni Morone, Italian cardinal (born 1509)
- 1581 – Alexander Briant, English Roman Catholic priest, martyr and saint (born 1556)
- 1581 – Edmund Campion, English Roman Catholic priest, martyr, and saint (born 1540)
- 1581 – Ralph Sherwin, English Roman Catholic priest, martyr, and saint (born 1550)

=== 1601–1900 ===
- 1633 – Isabella Clara Eugenia, infanta of Spain (born 1566)
- 1640 – Miguel de Vasconcelos, Portuguese politician, Prime Minister of Portugal (born 1590)
- 1660 – Pierre d'Hozier, French genealogist and historian (born 1592)
- 1729 – Giacomo F. Maraldi, French-Italian astronomer and mathematician (born 1665)
- 1750 – Johann Gabriel Doppelmayr, German mathematician, astronomer, and cartographer (born 1671)
- 1755 – Maurice Greene, English organist and composer (born 1696)
- 1767 – Henry Erskine, 10th Earl of Buchan, Scottish politician (born 1710)
- 1825 – Alexander I, emperor and autocrat of Russia (born 1777)
- 1865 – Abraham Emanuel Fröhlich, Swiss pastor, poet, and educator (born 1796)
- 1866 – George Everest, Welsh geographer and surveyor (born 1790)
- 1867 – Charles Gray Round, English lawyer and politician (born 1797)
- 1884 – William Swainson, English-New Zealand lawyer and politician, Attorney-General of the Crown Colony of New Zealand (born 1809)

=== 1901–present ===
- 1913 – Juhan Liiv, Estonian poet and author (born 1864)
- 1914 – Alfred Thayer Mahan, American captain and historian (born 1840)
- 1916 – Charles de Foucauld, French priest and martyr (born 1858)
- 1923 – Virginie Loveling, Belgian author and poet (born 1836)
- 1928 – José Eustasio Rivera, Colombian-American lawyer and poet (born 1888)
- 1933 – Pekka Halonen, Finnish painter (born 1865)
- 1934 – Sergey Kirov, Russian engineer and politician (born 1886)
- 1935 – Bernhard Schmidt, Estonian-German optician, invented the Schmidt camera (born 1879)
- 1942 – Leon Wachholz, Polish scientist and medical examiner (born 1867)
- 1943 – Damrong Rajanubhab, Thai historian and educator (born 1862)
- 1944 – Charlie Kerins, Irish Republican executed by hanging (born 1918)
- 1947 – Aleister Crowley, English magician, poet, and mountaineer (born 1875)
- 1947 – G. H. Hardy, English mathematician and theorist (born 1877)
- 1950 – Ernest John Moeran, English pianist and composer (born 1894)
- 1954 – Fred Rose, American pianist, composer, and publisher (born 1898)
- 1958 – Elizabeth Peratrovich, American civil rights activist (born 1911)
- 1964 – J. B. S. Haldane, English-Indian geneticist and biologist (born 1892)
- 1964 – Charilaos Vasilakos, Greek runner (born 1877)
- 1968 – Nicolae Bretan, Romanian opera singer, composer, and conductor (born 1887)
- 1968 – Darío Moreno, Turkish singer-songwriter, guitarist, and actor (born 1921)
- 1973 – David Ben-Gurion, Israeli politician, 1st Prime Minister of Israel (born 1886)
- 1975 – Nellie Fox, American baseball player and coach (born 1927)
- 1975 – Ernesto Maserati, Italian race car driver and engineer (born 1898)
- 1975 – Anna Roosevelt Halsted, American journalist (born 1906)
- 1981 – Russ Manning, American author and illustrator (born 1929)
- 1984 – Roelof Frankot, Dutch painter and photographer (born 1911)
- 1986 – Frank McCarthy, American general and film producer (born 1912)
- 1987 – James Baldwin, American novelist, poet, and critic (born 1924)
- 1987 – Punch Imlach, Canadian ice hockey player, coach, and manager (born 1918)
- 1988 – J. Vernon McGee, American pastor and theologian (born 1904)
- 1989 – Alvin Ailey, American dancer and choreographer (born 1931)
- 1990 – Carla Lehmann, Canadian-English actress (born 1917)
- 1991 – Pat O'Callaghan, Irish athlete (born 1906)
- 1991 – George Stigler, American economist and academic, Nobel Prize laureate (born 1911)
- 1993 – Ray Gillen, American singer-songwriter (born 1959)
- 1995 – Hopper Levett, English cricketer (born 1908)
- 1995 – Colin Tapley, New Zealand-English actor (born 1907)
- 1995 – Maxwell R. Thurman, American general (born 1931)
- 1996 – Peter Bronfman, Canadian businessman (born 1928)
- 1997 – Michel Bélanger, Canadian banker and businessman (born 1929)
- 1997 – Stéphane Grappelli, French violinist (born 1908)
- 1997 – Endicott Peabody, American lieutenant, lawyer, and politician, 62nd Governor of Massachusetts (born 1920)
- 1998 – Janet Lewis, American poet and novelist (born 1899)
- 2001 – Ellis R. Dungan, American director and producer (born 1909)
- 2002 – Edward L. Beach Jr., American captain and author (born 1918)
- 2002 – Dave McNally, American baseball player (born 1942)
- 2003 – Clark Kerr, American economist and academic (born 1911)
- 2003 – Eugenio Monti, Italian bobsledder (born 1928)
- 2004 – Prince Bernhard of Lippe-Biesterfeld (born 1911)
- 2004 – Bill Brown, Scottish footballer (born 1931)
- 2004 – Norman Newell, English record producer and lyricist (born 1919)
- 2005 – Gust Avrakotos, American CIA officer (born 1938)
- 2005 – Mary Hayley Bell, English actress and playwright (born 1911)
- 2005 – Freeman V. Horner, American soldier, Medal of Honor recipient (born 1922)
- 2006 – Claude Jade, French actress (born 1948)
- 2006 – Bruce Trigger, Canadian archaeologist, anthropologist, and historian (born 1937)
- 2007 – Ken McGregor, Australian tennis player and footballer (born 1929)
- 2007 – Anton Rodgers, British actor (born 1933)
- 2007 – Ivo Rojnica, Croatian-Argentine war crimes suspect, businessman, diplomat, and intelligence agent (born 1915)
- 2008 – Paul Benedict, American actor (born 1938)
- 2008 – Joseph B. Wirthlin, American businessman and religious leader (born 1917)
- 2010 – Adriaan Blaauw, Dutch astronomer and academic (born 1914)
- 2010 – Hillard Elkins, American actor and producer (born 1929)
- 2011 – Christa Wolf, German author and critic (born 1929)
- 2012 – Jovan Belcher, American football player (born 1987)
- 2012 – Arthur Chaskalson, South African lawyer and judge, 18th Chief Justice of South Africa (born 1931)
- 2012 – Rick Majerus, American basketball player and coach (born 1948)
- 2012 – Ed Price, American soldier, pilot, and politician (born 1918)
- 2012 – Israel Keyes, American serial killer (born 1978)
- 2013 – Richard Coughlan, English drummer (born 1947)
- 2013 – Stirling Colgate, American physicist and academic (born 1925)
- 2013 – Edward Heffron, American soldier (born 1923)
- 2013 – Martin Sharp, Australian cartoonist and songwriter (born 1942)
- 2014 – Mario Abramovich, Argentinian violinist and composer (born 1926)
- 2014 – Dimitrios Trichopoulos, Greek epidemiologist, oncologist, and academic (born 1938)
- 2014 – Rocky Wood, New Zealand-Australian author (born 1959)
- 2015 – Rob Blokzijl, Dutch physicist and computer scientist (born 1943)
- 2015 – Joseph Engelberger, American physicist and engineer (born 1925)
- 2015 – Jim Loscutoff, American basketball player (born 1930)
- 2015 – Trevor Obst, Australian footballer and coach (born 1940)
- 2018 – Vivian Lynn, New Zealand artist (born 1931)
- 2018 – Ken Berry, American actor, dancer, and singer (born 1933)
- 2019 – Paula Tilbrook, English actress (born 1930)
- 2020 – Arnie Robinson, American athlete (born 1948)
- 2022 – Gaylord Perry, American baseball player and coach (born 1938)
- 2023 – Sandra Day O'Connor, first female U.S. Supreme Court Justice (1981–2006) (born 1930)
- 2024 – Terry Griffiths, Welsh snooker player and coach (born 1947)
- 2024 – Ian Redpath, Australian cricketer and coach (born 1941)

== Holidays and observances ==
- Battle of the Sinop Day (Russia)
- Christian feast day:
  - Alexander Briant
  - Ansanus
  - Blessed Bruna Pellesi
  - Castritian
  - Charles de Foucauld
  - Edmund Campion
  - Eligius
  - Evasius
  - Grwst
  - Nahum
  - Nicholas Ferrar (Episcopal Church)
  - Ralph Sherwin
  - Ursicinus of Brescia
  - December 1 (Eastern Orthodox liturgics)
- Damrong Rajanubhab Day (Thailand)
- First President Day (Kazakhstan)
- Freedom and Democracy Day (Chad)
- Great Union Day, celebrates the union of Transylvania with Romania in 1918 (Romania)
- Military Abolition Day (Costa Rica)
- National Day (Myanmar)
- Republic Day (Central African Republic)
- Restoration of Independence Day (Portugal)
- Rosa Parks Day (Ohio and Oregon, United States)
- Self-governance Day or Fullveldisdagurinn (Iceland)
- Teachers' Day (Panama)
- World AIDS Day, and its related observances:
  - Day Without Art
