= Coke Zero Sugar 400 =

NASCAR Cup Series auto race held in Daytona Beach, Florida, US

NASCAR Cup Series
- Venue: Daytona International Speedway
- Location: Daytona Beach, Florida, United States
- Corporate sponsor: Coca-Cola Zero Sugar (The Coca-Cola Company)
- First race: 1959
- Distance: 400 miles (643.74 km)
- Laps: 160; Stage 1: 35; Stage 2: 60; Final stage: 65
- Previous names: Firecracker 250 (1959–1962); Firecracker 400 (1963–1968, 1970, 1972, 1974–1984); Medal of Honor Firecracker 400 (1969, 1971, 1973); Pepsi Firecracker 400 (1985–1988); Pepsi 400 (1989–2007); Coke Zero 400 powered by Coca-Cola (2008–2017)
- Most wins (driver): David Pearson (5)
- Most wins (team): Wood Brothers Racing (10)
- Most wins (manufacturer): Ford (24)

Circuit information
- Surface: Asphalt
- Length: 2.5 mi (4.0 km)
- Turns: 4

The Coke Zero Sugar 400 is an annual NASCAR Cup Series stock car race at Daytona International Speedway. First held in 1959, the event consists of 160 laps, 400-mile (640 km), and is the second of two major stock car events held at Daytona on the oval, the other being the Daytona 500. From its inception in 1959, it was traditionally held on or around the United States' Independence Day until 2019. In 2020, the race was moved to late August and has been the last race of the NASCAR regular season.

Since 2002, the NASCAR O'Reilly Auto Parts Series Winn-Dixie 250 race is held on Friday night. Ryan Preece is the defending winner of the race, having won it in 2026.

== History ==
=== 1959–1969 ===
Prior to the opening of the track, and prior to the inaugural Daytona 500, tentative plans were made to host a 300-mile USAC Championship (Indycar) race on Independence Day weekend of 1959. However, following two separate fatal accidents to drivers Marshall Teague (testing) and George Amick (Daytona 100), speedway officials canceled the race, citing dangerously high speeds, as well as a low turnout. Bill France Sr. announced plans to hold a 100-lap/250-mile NASCAR stock car race instead, scheduled for July 4.

The race was named the Firecracker 250 because the race would be held on the United States' Independence Day. Bill France announced on July 1 that the winner of the race would receive the Marshall Teague Memorial trophy, a trophy honoring and commemorating the life of Teague, who had died in February. The trophy had been presented by Teague's daughter and widow.

The inaugural race was held on July 4, 1959. It was scheduled to start at 11 a.m. to limit the possibility of afternoon interference from thunderstorms common to Florida and to exploit the potential for competitors meeting relatives and friends for an afternoon of fun at the nearby beaches. Before the race, preliminary activities took place, including a Miss Dixie pageant, where twenty aspiring pageant winning hopefuls marched to showcase their bathing suits. With 12,900 spectators in attendance, the race ran its scheduled 250 miles with no caution flags, and with a 57-second lead over runner-up Joe Weatherly, Daytona Beach native Fireball Roberts won in dominating fashion leading 84 of 100 laps. Over the course of the next three years, a couple of NASCAR's top drivers would go on to win the Firecracker 250, including Jack Smith, David Pearson, and a repeat victory in 1962 for Fireball Roberts.

In just three years from the race's inaugural event attendance had grown by more than 10,000 spectators, as tourists flocked to the beaches for the holidays. In 1963, the race was expanded from 100 laps to 160 laps, for a distance of 400 miles and subsequently became known as the Firecracker 400. In the same year, Fireball Roberts drove his 1963 Ford to victory, becoming the first driver to win back-to-back events, barely beating Fred Lorenzen. Roberts was unable to go for three straight wins due to his death on July 2, 1964.

Richard Petty was the man to beat during the sixth annual 400-mile July race, but on lap 103, engine problems cost him a chance at victory. Over the course of the final 56 laps, Bobby Isaac and rookie teammate A. J. Foyt swapped the lead 15 times. Coming out of the fourth turn, Foyt was able to barely edge out Isaac to the stripe; giving Foyt his first career NASCAR victory in only his tenth start. One year later Foyt got his second career win, becoming the second driver to win back-to-back Firecracker races.

Foyt did not try to defend the title of reigning race winner in 1966. Instead, it was the dark horse 1965 Rookie of the Year driver Sam McQuagg winning the race. McQuagg collected his first and only NASCAR victory driving a 1966 Dodge Charger while utilizing a new racing mechanism: the rear 'spoiler'. The air cutting spoiler allowed McQuagg to shatter Foyt's 151.451 mph race average set two years prior. Only two cars finished on the lead lap and the margin of victory to second place driver Darel Dieringer was sixty-six seconds.

In late March 1969 Bill France Sr. invited all surviving Medal of Honor recipients to attend the July 4 race, dubbed the Medal of Honor Firecracker 400. Chairman of the House Armed Services Committee would arrange for the heroes and their families to be flown in via military aircraft. 100 members from 31 states would attend the race with Thomas J. Kelly the president of The Medal of Honor Society as the grand marshal. With success, France Sr. invited them on two more occasions in 1971 and 1973, won by Bobby Isaac and David Pearson respectively.

=== 1970s ===
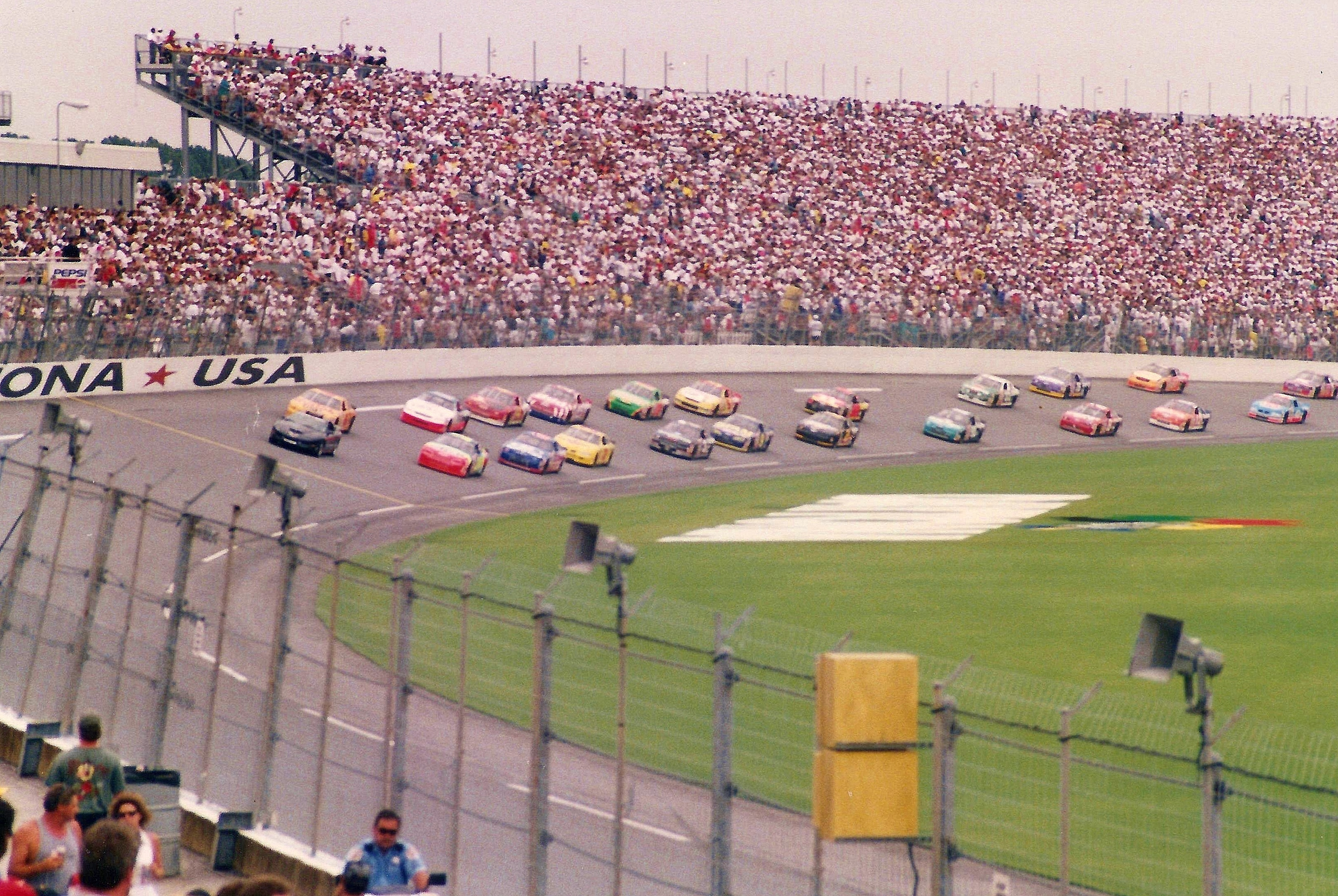
The 1996 Pepsi 400 at Daytona

In 1974, the maneuver used by David Pearson to win his third straight Firecracker race would be talked about well after he crossed the stripe. After collecting the white flag Pearson slowed his Wood Brothers 73' Mercury to allow Richard Petty to jump out to a seven-car lead. Following the race, Pearson was quoted saying "I thought Petty might be able to slingshot and draft past me on that last lap and that's why I didn't want to be leading..." Using the draft Pearson was able to close on Petty into the final turn and eventually passed him coming to the tri-oval for the win. Eight seconds behind the Pearson-Petty duel, Buddy Baker and Cale Yarborough seemed to have crossed the finish line at the same time. After two hours of deliberation, officials announced a dead heat for third place, the only tie recorded in NASCAR history. During the race, nine different drivers exchanged the lead 49 times, a race record that stood until it was broken with 57 between 25 different drivers in 2011.

After the 1974 Firecracker 400, David Pearson became the first and only driver to win three consecutive races and the first to win four July events. Before the 1975 race, he would try to extend his streak to five wins. However, with 19 laps remaining Pearson ended up having oil line complications and finished the race in the 20th position. Instead, five-time winning Daytona 500 driver Richard Petty, finally won the Daytona July race by edging out Buddy Baker, after 17 years of trying.

In 1977 Richard Petty collected his second win at Daytona in July, and it took almost four hours as the Firecracker witnessed its first rain-delayed race. Among the lineup were three female drivers; Lella Lombardi, Christine Beckers, and Janet Guthrie, who finished 31st, 37th, and 40th respectively. The following year, 1978, Pearson collected his final win at the track, becoming the only driver to win five July Daytona races, and became the most-winning driver at Daytona International Speedway with five wins, until Richard Petty won the Daytona 500 the following year.

=== 1980–1997 ===
In 1980, due to a tax dispute with the City of Daytona Beach and Volusia County, Bill France Sr. openly threatened to move the Firecracker 400 to the Indianapolis Motor Speedway. A few weeks later, however, the parties reconciled, and the plan to move the race was withdrawn.

In 1985, the race became known as the Pepsi Firecracker 400, when PepsiCo became the event's first title sponsor. In 1989, the "Firecracker" moniker was dropped, and the race was known simply as the Pepsi 400 through 2007.

From 1959 to 1987, the race was always scheduled for July 4, regardless of the day of the week. Beginning in 1988, the race was moved to the first Saturday of July (that nearest to July 4). Going forward, the race would only be held on July 4 in years in which it fell on a Saturday. Subsequent to this, the 1992 and 2009 races fell on July 4. Situated in early July, the race traditionally found itself falling at or very near the halfway point of the NASCAR season.

On July 4, 1987, in the wake of Bobby Allison's massive crash at Talladega, the cars were fitted with 390 CFM carburetors. The change helped slow the cars down by several mph. On the final lap, Ken Schrader flipped upside-down in the tri-oval as the field crossed the finish line. It would be the final race at Daytona without restrictor plates.

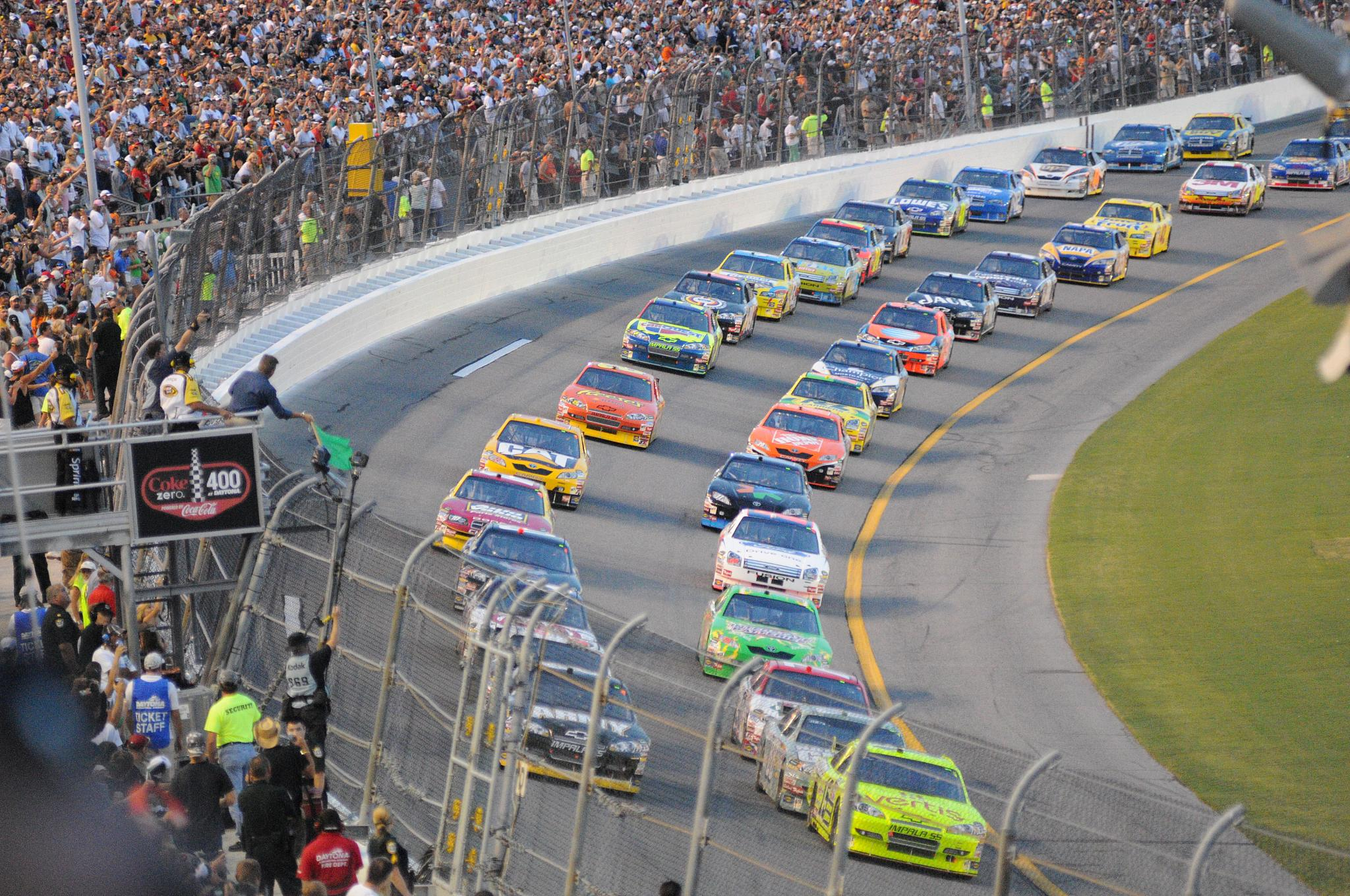
2008 Coke Zero 400

From 1959 to 1997, the race was scheduled to begin in the morning (10:00 a.m. or 11:00 a.m. eastern). This was to avoid hot summer temperatures and the frequent mid-afternoon thunderstorms in Florida. It was also a "chamber of commerce" goodwill effort by track management to boost the local tourism industry. Barring any lengthy delays, it left ample time in the afternoon for fans to depart the speedway and visit the nearby beaches and attractions. Participants were even said to have exploited the time to also visit the beaches with their families, treating the event as a mini-vacation from the busy grind of the racing season.

During live ESPN telecasts, the term "Breakfast at Daytona" was used, a gesture to NBC's popular "Breakfast at Wimbledon", taking place the same weekend. The 1997 race was the final time the 400 was scheduled to begin in the morning and run during the daytime.

=== 1998–2019 ===
In July 1997, Daytona International Speedway announced a massive lighting project to be constructed by MUSCO lighting, the same company that installed lights at Charlotte. In 1998, the race was subtitled the "Pepsi 400 at Daytona" (to differentiate it from another race titled the Pepsi 400, held at Michigan during that time frame.) Plans called for the Pepsi 400 to be held under-the-lights in primetime. Going forwards, the race would typically be scheduled for Saturday night of July 4 weekend, and created the potential for more comfortable conditions for fans, and a larger primetime television audience.

On the day of the scheduled race, wildfires in Florida consumed the surrounding areas, and the track had to be converted into a firefighters' staging area. Track officials rescheduled the race for October 17. In front of a near-sellout crowd–a first for the event, it became the longest speedway with a night race, and the first restrictor-plate race held at night. In 1999, the race returned to the traditional July 4 weekend slot and continues to be scheduled as a night race.

In 2008, the long partnership with PepsiCo ended. As part of a multi-year deal, The Coca-Cola Company became the exclusive beverage supplier of ISC tracks, including Daytona. Title sponsorship for this race was also included, with the Coke Zero brand having been used ever since.

During the 2010 race, NASCAR Chief Marketing Officer Steve Phelps was featured on the CBS reality show Undercover Boss. Scenes from the program were filmed at the race weekend.

=== Since 2020 ===
In 2020, the Coke Zero 400 was moved from its traditional Independence Day weekend date to late August. It served as the final race of the NASCAR "regular season" before the NASCAR playoffs begin. The race continued to be scheduled as a night race. After being held on or around July 4 for 60 of the previous 61 years, the move to August was controversial. According to the Daytona Beach Area Convention & Visitors Bureau, the move was requested in order to spread tourism in the area throughout the summer.

In 2024, it was the second to last race due to schedule changes that needed to be made in accordance with 2024 Summer Olympics broadcasting. NASCAR moved the regular season finale that year to Darlington.

=== Presidential visits ===
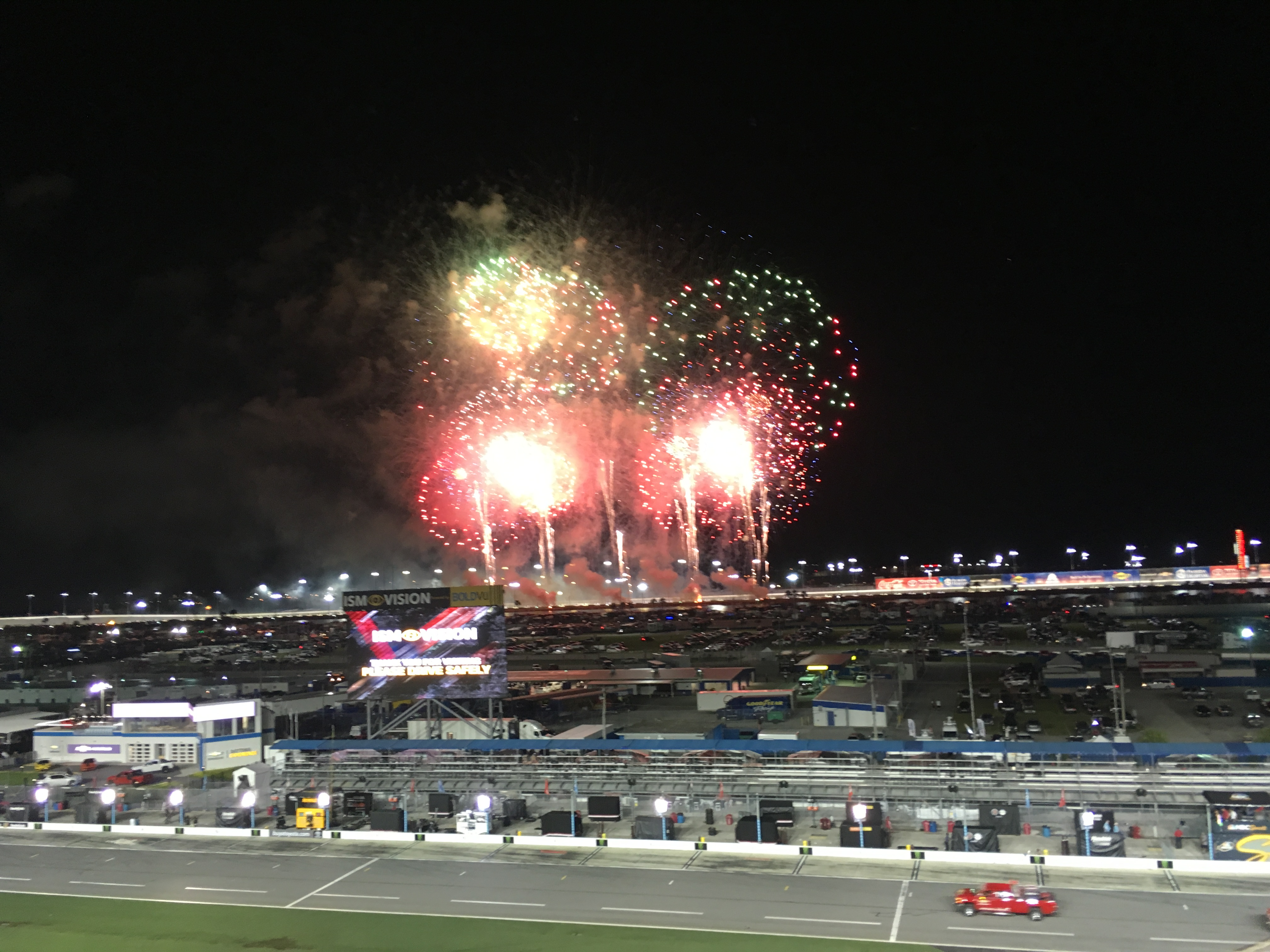
Fireworks display after the 2018 Coke Zero Sugar 400

With the race's fundamental link to Independence Day, U.S. Presidents have been in attendance on two notable occasions.

On July 4, 1984, President Ronald Reagan became the first sitting U.S. President to attend a NASCAR race. The President gave the starting command by phone from aboard Air Force One. Landing at Daytona, the President proceeded to the track and viewed the race with Bill France Jr. During his time at the race, Reagan was interviewed by Ned Jarrett, who in 1978 had begun a career as a radio race broadcaster. The 1984 Firecracker 400 is also legendary since it was the race at which Richard Petty achieved his unparalleled 200th (and final) win. Petty and President Reagan were interviewed together following the race, and the President joined Richard Petty and his family in Victory Lane.

On July 4, 1992, President George H. W. Bush attended the race, which served as a Daytona farewell tribute to Richard Petty during his "Fan Appreciation Tour." Bush, on the 1992 campaign trail, participated in pre-race festivities, gave the starting command, and rode around the track in the pace car during the pace laps. Petty qualified a strong second, and led the first 5 laps of the race, and quickly fell back to the end of the field. He succumbed to heat exhaustion, however and dropped out four laps beyond the halfway point.

On July 1, 2000, the Texas governor and future president George W. Bush attended the race while on the campaign trail, and gave the starting command. Bush was courting the so-called NASCAR dad demographic, as well as the hotly contested Florida vote in particular.

=== First wins ===
The Coke Zero Sugar 400 has produced a number of drivers' first career NASCAR Grand National/Cup Series victories. Drivers include A. J. Foyt, Sam McQuagg, Greg Sacks, Jimmy Spencer, John Andretti, Greg Biffle, David Ragan, Aric Almirola, Erik Jones, Justin Haley, William Byron, Harrison Burton and Ryan Preece. For McQuagg, Sacks, Haley, and Burton, the win is the only victory in their respective Cup Series careers.

The 400 has also marked the first of multiple points-paying victories at Daytona for a total of seven drivers, including Jeff Gordon (1995), Dale Earnhardt - after 24 previous attempts from 1978 to 1990, Dale Earnhardt Jr. (2001), and Jamie McMurray (2007). David Pearson won the 400 four times prior to finally winning the Daytona 500 in 1976, and Dale Earnhardt won the 400 twice before his 1998 Daytona 500 victory.

In 2000, it was Jeff Burton's first and only restrictor-plate win. In addition, Tony Stewart won the 400 four times but never won the Daytona 500 (his best finish being second in 2004).

== Past winners ==
Year	Day	Date	No.	Driver	Team	Manufacturer	Race Distance		Race Time	Average Speed (mph)	Report	Ref
Year	Day	Date	No.	Driver	Team	Manufacturer	Laps	Miles (km)	Race Time	Average Speed (mph)	Report	Ref
1959	Saturday	July 4	3	Fireball Roberts	Jim Stephens	Pontiac	100	250 (402.336)	1:46:42	140.581	Report	
1960	Monday	July 4	47	Jack Smith	Jack Smith	Pontiac	100	250 (402.336)	1:42:09	146.842	Report	
1961	Tuesday	July 4	3	David Pearson	John Masoni	Pontiac	100	250 (402.336)	1:37:13	154.294	Report	
1962	Wednesday	July 4	22	Fireball Roberts	Banjo Matthews	Pontiac	100	250 (402.336)	1:37:36	153.688	Report	
1963	Thursday	July 4	22	Fireball Roberts	Holman-Moody	Ford	160	400 (643.737)	2:39:01	150.927	Report	
1964	Saturday	July 4	47	A. J. Foyt	Ray Nichels	Dodge	160	400 (643.737)	2:38:28	151.451	Report	
1965	Sunday	July 4	41	A. J. Foyt	Wood Brothers Racing	Ford	160	400 (643.737)	2:39:57	150.046	Report	
1966	Monday	July 4	98	Sam McQuagg	Ray Nichels	Dodge	160	400 (643.737)	2:36:02	153.813	Report	
1967	Tuesday	July 4	21	Cale Yarborough	Wood Brothers Racing	Ford	160	400 (643.737)	2:47:09	143.583	Report	
1968	Thursday	July 4	21	Cale Yarborough	Wood Brothers Racing	Mercury	160	400 (643.737)	2:23:30	167.247	Report	
1969	Friday	July 4	98	LeeRoy Yarbrough	Junior Johnson & Associates	Ford	160	400 (643.737)	2:29:11	160.875	Report	
1970	Saturday	July 4	27	Donnie Allison	Banjo Matthews	Ford	160	400 (643.737)	2:27:56	162.235	Report	
1971	Sunday	July 4	71	Bobby Isaac	Nord Krauskopf	Dodge	160	400 (643.737)	2:28:12	161.947	Report	
1972	Tuesday	July 4	21	David Pearson	Wood Brothers Racing	Mercury	160	400 (643.737)	2:29:14	160.821	Report	
1973	Wednesday	July 4	21	David Pearson	Wood Brothers Racing	Mercury	160	400 (643.737)	2:31:27	158.468	Report	
1974	Thursday	July 4	21	David Pearson	Wood Brothers Racing	Mercury	160	400 (643.737)	2:53:32	138.310	Report	
1975	Friday	July 4	43	Richard Petty	Petty Enterprises	Dodge	160	400 (643.737)	2:31:32	158.381	Report	
1976	Sunday	July 4	11	Cale Yarborough	Junior Johnson & Associates	Chevrolet	160	400 (643.737)	2:29:06	160.966	Report	
1977*	Monday	July 4	43	Richard Petty	Petty Enterprises	Dodge	160	400 (643.737)	2:48:10	142.716	Report	
1978	Tuesday	July 4	21	David Pearson	Wood Brothers Racing	Mercury	160	400 (643.737)	2:35:30	154.340	Report	
1979	Wednesday	July 4	21	Neil Bonnett	Wood Brothers Racing	Mercury	160	400 (643.737)	2:18:49	172.890	Report	
1980	Friday	July 4	15	Bobby Allison	Bud Moore Engineering	Mercury	160	400 (643.737)	2:18:21	173.473	Report	
1981	Saturday	July 4	27	Cale Yarborough	M.C. Anderson Racing	Buick	160	400 (643.737)	2:48:32	142.588	Report	
1982	Sunday	July 4	88	Bobby Allison	DiGard Motorsports	Buick	160	400 (643.737)	2:27:09	163.099	Report	
1983	Monday	July 4	21	Buddy Baker	Wood Brothers Racing	Ford	160	400 (643.737)	2:23:20	167.442	Report	
1984	Wednesday	July 4	43	Richard Petty	Curb Racing	Pontiac	160	400 (643.737)	2:19:59	171.204	Report	
1985	Thursday	July 4	10	Greg Sacks	DiGard Motorsports	Chevrolet	160	400 (643.737)	2:31:12	158.730	Report	
1986	Friday	July 4	25	Tim Richmond	Hendrick Motorsports	Chevrolet	160	400 (643.737)	3:01:56	131.916	Report	
1987	Saturday	July 4	22	Bobby Allison	Stavola Brothers Racing	Buick	160	400 (643.737)	2:29:00	161.074	Report	
1988	Saturday	July 2	9	Bill Elliott	Melling Racing	Ford	160	400 (643.737)	2:26:58	163.302	Report	
1989	Saturday	July 1	28	Davey Allison	Robert Yates Racing	Ford	160	400 (643.737)	3:01:32	132.207	Report	
1990	Saturday	July 7	3	Dale Earnhardt	Richard Childress Racing	Chevrolet	160	400 (643.737)	2:29:10	160.894	Report	
1991	Saturday	July 6	9	Bill Elliott	Melling Racing	Ford	160	400 (643.737)	2:30:50	159.116	Report	
1992	Saturday	July 4	4	Ernie Irvan	Morgan-McClure Motorsports	Chevrolet	160	400 (643.737)	2:20:47	170.457	Report	
1993	Saturday	July 3	3	Dale Earnhardt	Richard Childress Racing	Chevrolet	160	400 (643.737)	2:38:09	151.755	Report	
1994	Saturday	July 2	27	Jimmy Spencer	Junior Johnson & Associates	Ford	160	400 (643.737)	2:34:17	155.558	Report	
1995	Saturday	July 1	24	Jeff Gordon	Hendrick Motorsports	Chevrolet	160	400 (643.737)	2:23:44	166.976	Report	
1996	Saturday	July 6	4	Sterling Marlin	Morgan-McClure Motorsports	Chevrolet	117*	292.5 (470.733)	1:48:36	161.602	Report	
1997	Saturday	July 5	98	John Andretti	Cale Yarborough Motorsports	Ford	160	400 (643.737)	2:32:06	157.791	Report	
1998	Saturday	October 17*	24	Jeff Gordon	Hendrick Motorsports	Chevrolet	160	400 (643.737)	2:46:02	144.549	Report	
1999	Saturday	July 3	88	Dale Jarrett	Robert Yates Racing	Ford	160	400 (643.737)	2:21:50	169.213	Report	
2000	Saturday	July 1	99	Jeff Burton	Roush Racing	Ford	160	400 (643.737)	2:41:32	148.576	Report	
2001	Saturday	July 7	8	Dale Earnhardt Jr.	Dale Earnhardt, Inc.	Chevrolet	160	400 (643.737)	2:32:17	157.601	Report	
2002	Saturday	July 6	15	Michael Waltrip	Dale Earnhardt, Inc.	Chevrolet	160	400 (643.737)	2:56:32	135.952	Report	
2003	Saturday	July 5	16	Greg Biffle	Roush Racing	Ford	160	400 (643.737)	2:24:29	166.109	Report	
2004	Saturday; Sunday	July 3–4*	24	Jeff Gordon	Hendrick Motorsports	Chevrolet	160	400 (643.737)	2:45:23	145.117	Report	
2005	Saturday; Sunday	July 2–3*	20	Tony Stewart	Joe Gibbs Racing	Chevrolet	160	400 (643.737)	3:03:11	131.016	Report	
2006	Saturday	July 1	20	Tony Stewart	Joe Gibbs Racing	Chevrolet	160	400 (643.737)	2:36:43	153.143	Report	
2007	Saturday	July 7	26	Jamie McMurray	Roush Fenway Racing	Ford	160	400 (643.737)	2:52:41	138.983	Report	
2008	Saturday	July 5	18	Kyle Busch	Joe Gibbs Racing	Toyota	162*	405 (651.784)	2:55:23	138.554	Report	
2009	Saturday	July 4	14	Tony Stewart	Stewart–Haas Racing	Chevrolet	160	400 (643.737)	2:48:28	142.461	Report	
2010	Saturday; Sunday	July 3–4*	29	Kevin Harvick	Richard Childress Racing	Chevrolet	166*	415 (667.878)	3:03:28	130.814	Report	
2011	Saturday	July 2	6	David Ragan	Roush Fenway Racing	Ford	170*	425 (683.971)	2:39:53	159.491	Report	
2012	Saturday	July 7	14	Tony Stewart	Stewart–Haas Racing	Chevrolet	160	400 (643.737)	2:32:14	157.653	Report	
2013	Saturday	July 6	48	Jimmie Johnson	Hendrick Motorsports	Chevrolet	161*	402.5 (647.76)	2:36:30	154.313	Report	
2014	Sunday	July 6*	43	Aric Almirola	Richard Petty Motorsports	Ford	112*	280 (450.616)	2:09:14	130.014	Report	
2015	Sunday; Monday	July 5–6*	88	Dale Earnhardt Jr.	Hendrick Motorsports	Chevrolet	161*	402.5 (647.76)	2:58:58	134.941	Report	
2016	Saturday	July 2	2	Brad Keselowski	Team Penske	Ford	161*	402.5 (647.76)	2:40:38	150.342	Report	
2017	Saturday	July 1	17	Ricky Stenhouse Jr.	Roush Fenway Racing	Ford	163*	407.5 (655.807)	3:17:12	123.986	Report	
2018	Saturday	July 7	20	Erik Jones	Joe Gibbs Racing	Toyota	168*	420 (675.924)	3:13:12	130.435	Report	
2019	Sunday	July 7*	77	Justin Haley	Spire Motorsports	Chevrolet	127*	317.5 (510.967)	2:14:58	141.146	Report	
2020	Saturday	August 29	24	William Byron	Hendrick Motorsports	Chevrolet	164*	410 (659.831)	2:39:59	153.766	Report	
2021	Saturday	August 28	12	Ryan Blaney	Team Penske	Ford	165*	412.5 (663.853)	2:54:03	142.201	Report	
2022	Sunday	August 28*	3	Austin Dillon	Richard Childress Racing	Chevrolet	160	400 (643.737)	2:52:44	138.942	Report	
2023	Saturday	August 26	17	Chris Buescher	RFK Racing	Ford	163*	407.5 (655.807)	2:34:22	158.389	Report	
2024	Saturday	August 24	21	Harrison Burton	Wood Brothers Racing	Ford	164*	410 (659.83)	3:01:40	135.413	Report	
2025	Saturday	August 23	12	Ryan Blaney	Team Penske	Ford	160	400 (643.737)	3:03:20	130.909	Report	
2026	Saturday	August 29	60	Ryan Preece	RFK Racing	Ford	166*	415 (667.878)	2:40:58	154.69	Report	
2027	Saturday	August 28									Report	

- 2008, 2010–2011, 2013, 2015–2018, 2020–2021, 2023–2024, & 2026: Races extended due to NASCAR overtime.
- 1996, 2014, & 2019: Races shortened due to rain.
- 1998: Postponed to October 17 due to Florida wildfires.
- 2004–2005 & 2010: Races postponed same day due to rain; ran on Saturday and ended after midnight on Sunday.
- 2014, 2019, & 2022: Race postponed from Saturday night to Sunday due to rain
- 2015: Moved from Saturday to Sunday by host broadcaster NBC, postponed same day due to rain, and ended after midnight on Monday.

=== Statistics ===
==== Multiple winners (drivers) ====
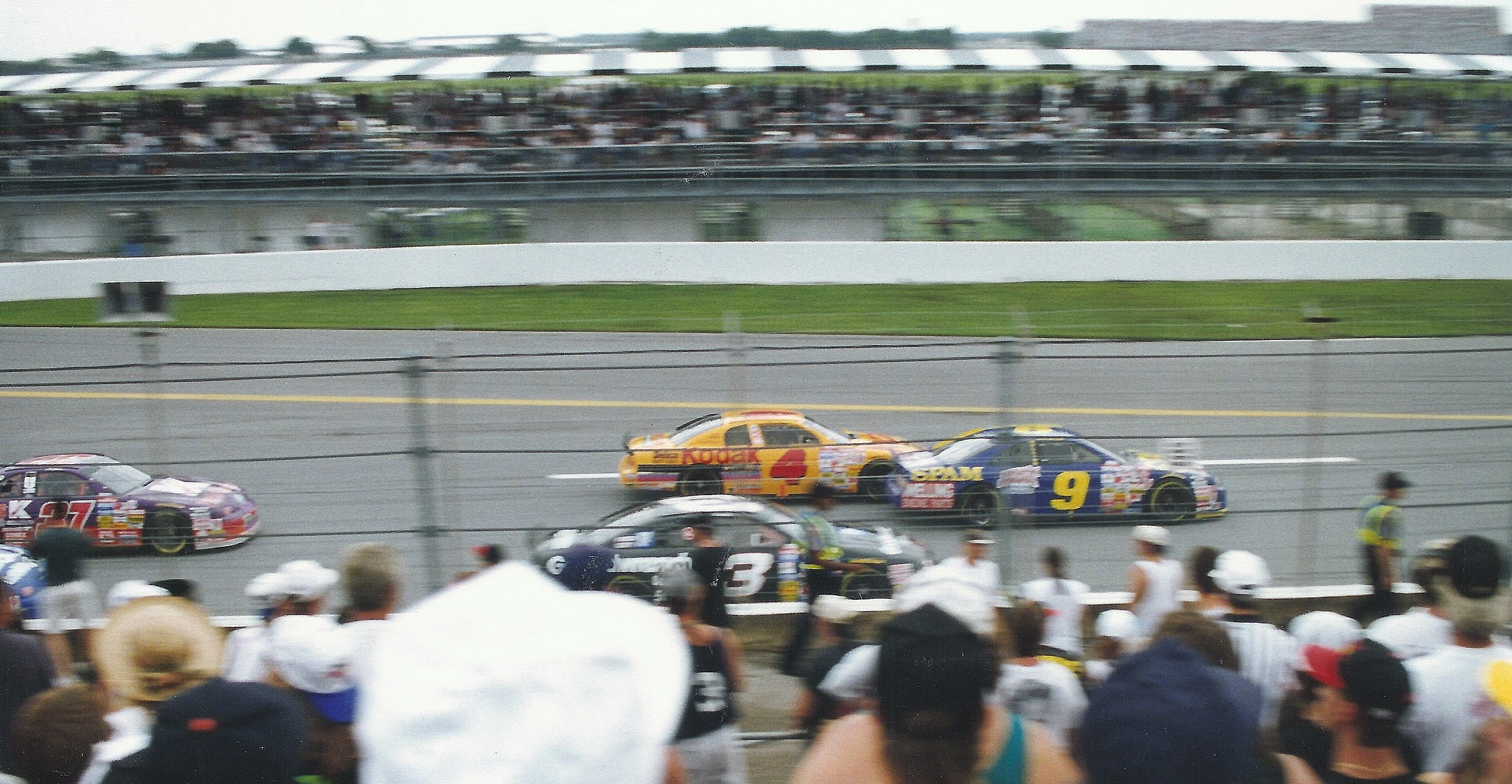
1996 Pepsi 400

# Wins	Driver	Years won
5	David Pearson	1961, 1972–1974, 1978
4	Cale Yarborough	1967–1968, 1976, 1981
4	Tony Stewart	2005–2006, 2009, 2012
3	Fireball Roberts	1959, 1962–1963
3	Richard Petty	1975, 1977, 1984
3	Bobby Allison	1980, 1982, 1987
3	Jeff Gordon	1995, 1998, 2004
2	A. J. Foyt	1964–1965
2	Bill Elliott	1988, 1991
2	Dale Earnhardt	1990, 1993
2	Dale Earnhardt Jr.	2001, 2015
2	Ryan Blaney	2021, 2025

==== Multiple winners (teams) ====
# Wins	Team	Years won
10	Wood Brothers Racing	1965, 1967–1968, 1972–1974, 1978–1979, 1983, 2024
7	Hendrick Motorsports	1986, 1995, 1998, 2004, 2013, 2015, 2020
7	RFK Racing	2000, 2003, 2007, 2011, 2017, 2023, 2026
4	Joe Gibbs Racing	2005–2006, 2008, 2018
4	Richard Childress Racing	1990, 1993, 2010, 2022
3	Junior Johnson & Associates	1969, 1976, 1994
3	Petty Enterprises/Richard Petty Motorsports	1975, 1977, 2014
3	Team Penske	2016, 2021, 2025
2	Banjo Matthews	1962, 1970
2	Ray Nichels	1964, 1966
2	DiGard Motorsports	1982, 1985
2	Melling Racing	1988, 1991
2	Robert Yates Racing	1989, 1999
2	Morgan-McClure Motorsports	1992, 1996
2	Dale Earnhardt, Inc.	2001–2002
2	Stewart–Haas Racing	2009, 2012

==== Manufacturer wins ====
# Wins	Manufacturer	Years won
24	Ford	1963, 1965, 1967, 1969–1970, 1983, 1988–1989, 1991, 1994, 1997, 1999, 2000, 2003, 2007, 2011, 2014, 2016–2017, 2021, 2023–2026
22	Chevrolet	1976,1985–1986, 1990, 1992–1993, 1995–1996, 1998, 2001–2002, 2004–2006, 2009–2010, 2012–2013, 2015, 2019–2020, 2022
7	Mercury	1968, 1972–1974, 1978–1980
5	Dodge	1964, 1966, 1971, 1975, 1977
5	Pontiac	1959–1962, 1984
3	Buick	1981–1982, 1987
2	Toyota	2008, 2018

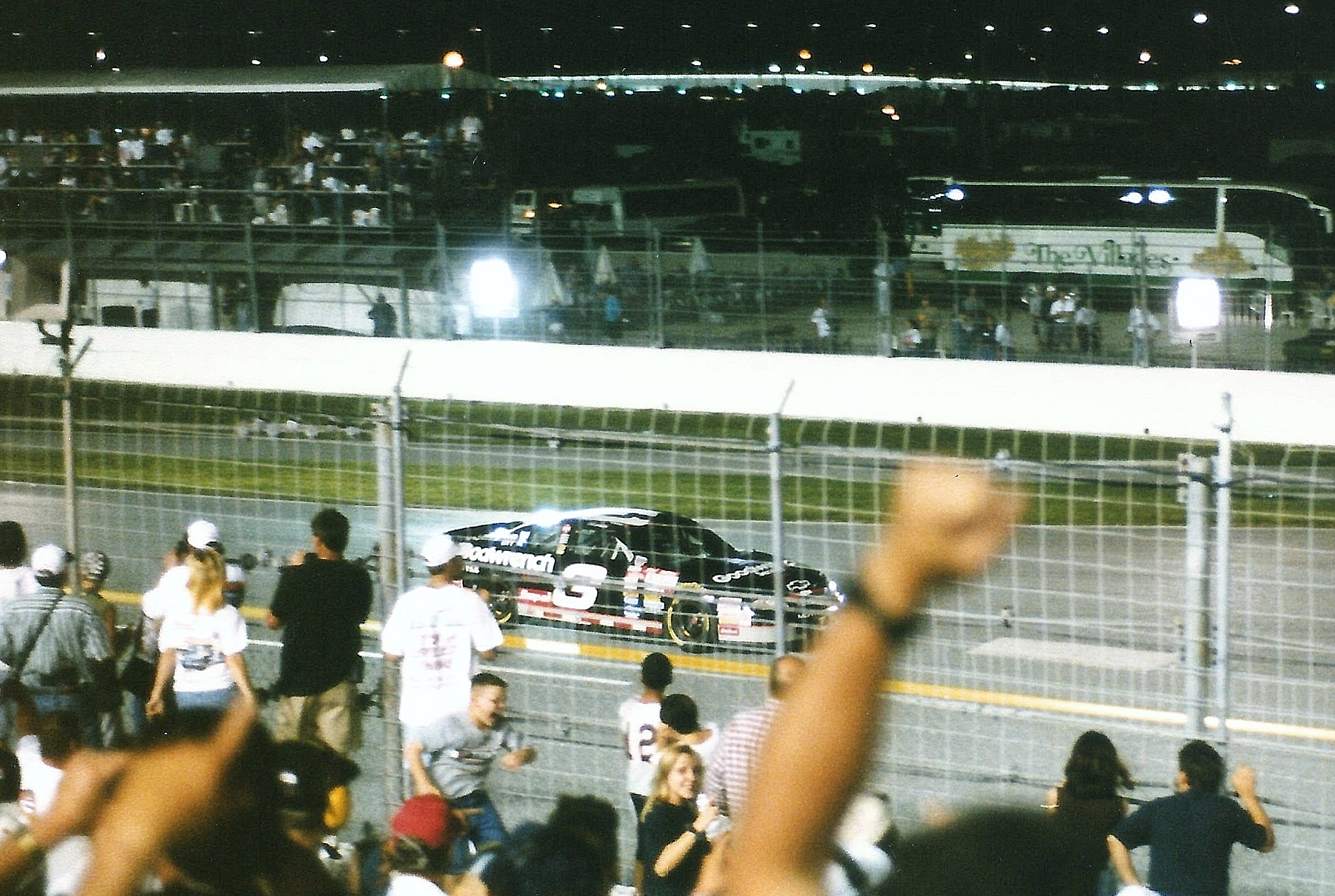
Dale Earnhardt at 1998 Pepsi 400

==== Consecutive victories ====
- 3 consecutive victories
  - David Pearson (1972, 1973, 1974)
- 2 consecutive victories
  - Fireball Roberts (1962, 1963)
  - A. J. Foyt (1964, 1965)
  - Cale Yarborough (1967, 1968)
  - Tony Stewart (2005, 2006)

==== Coke Zero 400 & Daytona 500 ====
Many drivers who have won the Daytona 500 have also won the Coke Zero 400 at some point in their career. In addition, almost every multiple-time Daytona 500 winner has won at least one Coke Zero 400 in the career, with the exception of Matt Kenseth who has won the Daytona 500 in 2009 and 2012, but never the July race. In the reverse direction, Tony Stewart has won the Coke Zero 400 four times, but never the Daytona 500 (his best 500 finish being second, behind Dale Earnhardt Jr. in 2004). Among the most notable, David Pearson won the 400 four times prior to finally winning the Daytona 500 in 1976.

The drivers who have won the Coke Zero 400 and the Daytona 500 are as follows (Bold indicates winning both in the same season):

Driver	Daytona 500 win(s)	Coke Zero Sugar 400 win(s)
Richard Petty	1964, 1966, 1971, 1973, 1974, 1979, 1981	1975, 1977, 1984
Cale Yarborough	**1968**, 1977, 1983, 1984	1967, **1968**, 1976, 1981
Bobby Allison	1978, **1982**, 1988	1980, **1982**, 1987
Jeff Gordon	1997, 1999, 2005	1995, 1998, 2004
Dale Jarrett	1993, 1996, 2000	1999
Bill Elliott	1985, 1987	1988, 1991
Sterling Marlin	1994, 1995	1996
Michael Waltrip	2001, 2003	2002
Dale Earnhardt Jr.	2004, 2014	2001, 2015
Jimmie Johnson	2006, **2013**	**2013**
William Byron	2024, 2025	2020
David Pearson	1976	1961, 1972, 1973, 1974, 1978
Fireball Roberts	**1962**	**1962**, 1963
A. J. Foyt	1972	1964, 1965
Dale Earnhardt	1998	1990, 1993
LeeRoy Yarbrough	**1969**	**1969**
Buddy Baker	1980	1983
Ernie Irvan	1991	1992
Davey Allison	1992	1989
Kevin Harvick	2007	2010
Jamie McMurray	2010	2007
Austin Dillon	2018	2022
Ricky Stenhouse Jr.	2023	2017

- In 1982, Bobby Allison swept the Busch Clash, Daytona 500 and Firecracker 400 in the same season.

== See also ==
- Winn-Dixie 250 – A NASCAR O'Reilly Auto Parts Series race that takes place during the same weekend of the Coke Zero Sugar 400
- WeatherTech 240 – A Grand-Am Rolex Sports Car Series race that took place on the same day as the Coke Zero Sugar 400

Previous race: Enjoy Illinois 300	NASCAR Cup Series; Coke Zero Sugar 400	Next race: Cook Out Southern 500
