= Thomas J. Kelly (Medal of Honor) =

United States Army Medal of Honor recipient

- Sergeant Thomas J. Kelly
- Born: September 9, 1923; New York City, US
- Died: October 2, 1988 (aged 65); Somers Point, New Jersey, US
- Burial place: Arlington National Cemetery
- Military career
- Allegiance: United States of America
- Branch: United States Army
- Rank: Sergeant
- Units: 48th Armored Infantry Battalion, 7th Armored Division
- Conflicts: World War II
- Awards: Medal of Honor

Thomas Joseph Kelly (September 9, 1923 – October 2, 1988) was a United States Army soldier and a recipient of the United States military's highest decoration—the Medal of Honor—for his actions in World War II.

== Biography ==
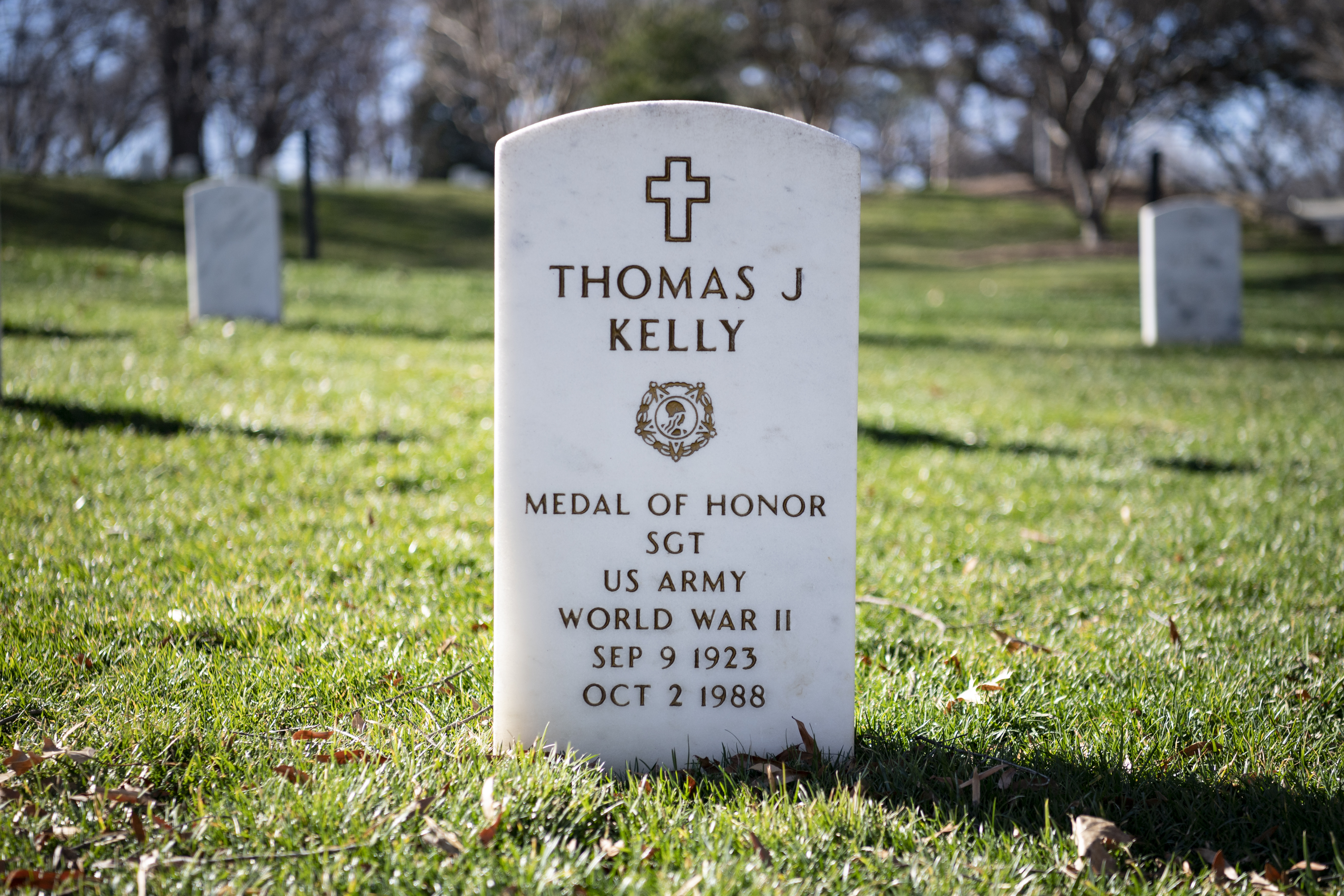
Grave at Arlington National Cemetery

Kelly joined the Army from his birthplace of Brooklyn, New York, and by April 5, 1945, was serving as a corporal in the Medical Detachment of the 48th Armored Infantry Battalion, 7th Armored Division. On that day, in Alemert, Germany, he repeatedly exposed himself to hostile fire in order to drag wounded men to safety. For these actions, he received the Medal of Honor at White House Ceremony six months later, on October 12, 1945.

During this ceremony on South Lawn of White House was Medal of Honor awarded to other members of U.S. Armed Forces: Cpl. Thomas. E. Atkins, Cpl. Edward A. Bennett, Cpl. Melvin E. Biddle, Capt. James M. Burt, Cpl. Clarence B. Craft, Cpl. Desmond T. Doss, T. Sgt. Freeman V. Horner, T. Sgt. Christos H. Karaberis, Sgt. Dexter. J. Kerstetter, Sgt. Nicholas Oresko, T. Sgt. Cleto L. Rodriguez, 1st Lt. Edward A. Silk, 2d Lt. John C. Sjogren, and Pfc. William A. Soderman.

Kelly reached the rank of sergeant before leaving the Army. Kelly was a graduate of the Fordham University Law School and served as president of the Congressional Medal of Honor Society. He died at age 65 and was buried in Arlington National Cemetery, Arlington County, Virginia.

== Medal of Honor citation ==
Corporal Kelly's official Medal of Honor citation reads:

He was an aid man with the 1st Platoon of Company C during an attack on the town of Alemert, Germany. The platoon, committed in a flanking maneuver, had advanced down a small, open valley overlooked by wooded slopes hiding enemy machineguns and tanks, when the attack was stopped by murderous fire that inflicted heavy casualties in the American ranks. Ordered to withdraw, Cpl. Kelly reached safety with uninjured remnants of the unit, but, on realizing the extent of casualties suffered by the platoon, voluntarily retraced his steps and began evacuating his comrades under direct machinegun fire. He was forced to crawl, dragging the injured behind him for most of the 300 yards separating the exposed area from a place of comparative safety. Two other volunteers who attempted to negotiate the hazardous route with him were mortally wounded, but he kept on with his herculean task after dressing their wounds and carrying them to friendly hands. In all, he made 10 separate trips through the brutal fire, each time bringing out a man from the death trap. Seven more casualties who were able to crawl by themselves he guided and encouraged in escaping from the hail of fire. After he had completed his heroic, self-imposed task and was near collapse from fatigue, he refused to leave his platoon until the attack had been resumed and the objective taken. Cpl. Kelly's gallantry and intrepidity in the face of seemingly certain death saved the lives of many of his fellow soldiers and was an example of bravery under fire.

== Awards and decorations ==

Badge	Combat Medical Badge		
1st row	Medal of Honor	Bronze Star Medal	Army Good Conduct Medal
2nd row	American Campaign Medal	European–African–Middle Eastern Campaign Medal with one campaign star	World War II Victory Medal

== See also ==
- List of Medal of Honor recipients for World War II
