= Horiba =

Japanese manufacturing company

HORIBA, Ltd.
- Type: Public KK
- Traded as: TYO: 6856
- Industry: Electronics/measurement Instruments
- Founded: Kyoto, Japan
- Founder: Masao Horiba
- Headquarters: 2 Miyanohigashi, Kisshoin, Minami-ku Kyoto, 601-8510 Japan
- Area served: Worldwide
- Key people: Atsushi Horiba (Chairman & Group CEO)
- Products: Automotive emission measurement systems, environmental measuring instruments, scientific analyzers, medical diagnostic analyzers, semiconductor metrology equipment, peripheral measuring devices, analysis devices, Raman Spectroscopy, Fluorescence Spectroscopy, A-TEEM Molecular Fingerprinting
- Revenue: ▲US$ 1,887 million (FY 2019) (¥ 200,241 million) (FY 2019)
- Net income: ▲US$ 145 million (FY 2019) (¥ 15,481 million) (FY 2019)
- Number of employees: 8,288 (As of December 31, 2019)
- Website: Official website

Horiba, Ltd. (堀場製作所, Kabushiki-gaisha Horiba Seisaku-sho) is a Japanese manufacturer of precision instruments for measurement and analysis. They make instruments that measure and analyze automobile exhaust gas (80% share of the world market), and environmental, medical and scientific applications.

Horiba is one of the top 25 analytical and life sciences instrumentation companies in the world.

The group has been involved in measurement technology since October 1945. It is diversified in 5 different sectors: automotive tests systems (36% activity), environmental (11%), medical (17%), semiconductor (19%) and scientific fields (17%). Today, the group, chaired by Atsushi Horiba, gathers 5,965 employees worldwide and generated 1 294 million of dollars in 2014.

The motto of HORIBA Ltd. is "Joy and Fun".

== Development of the company ==
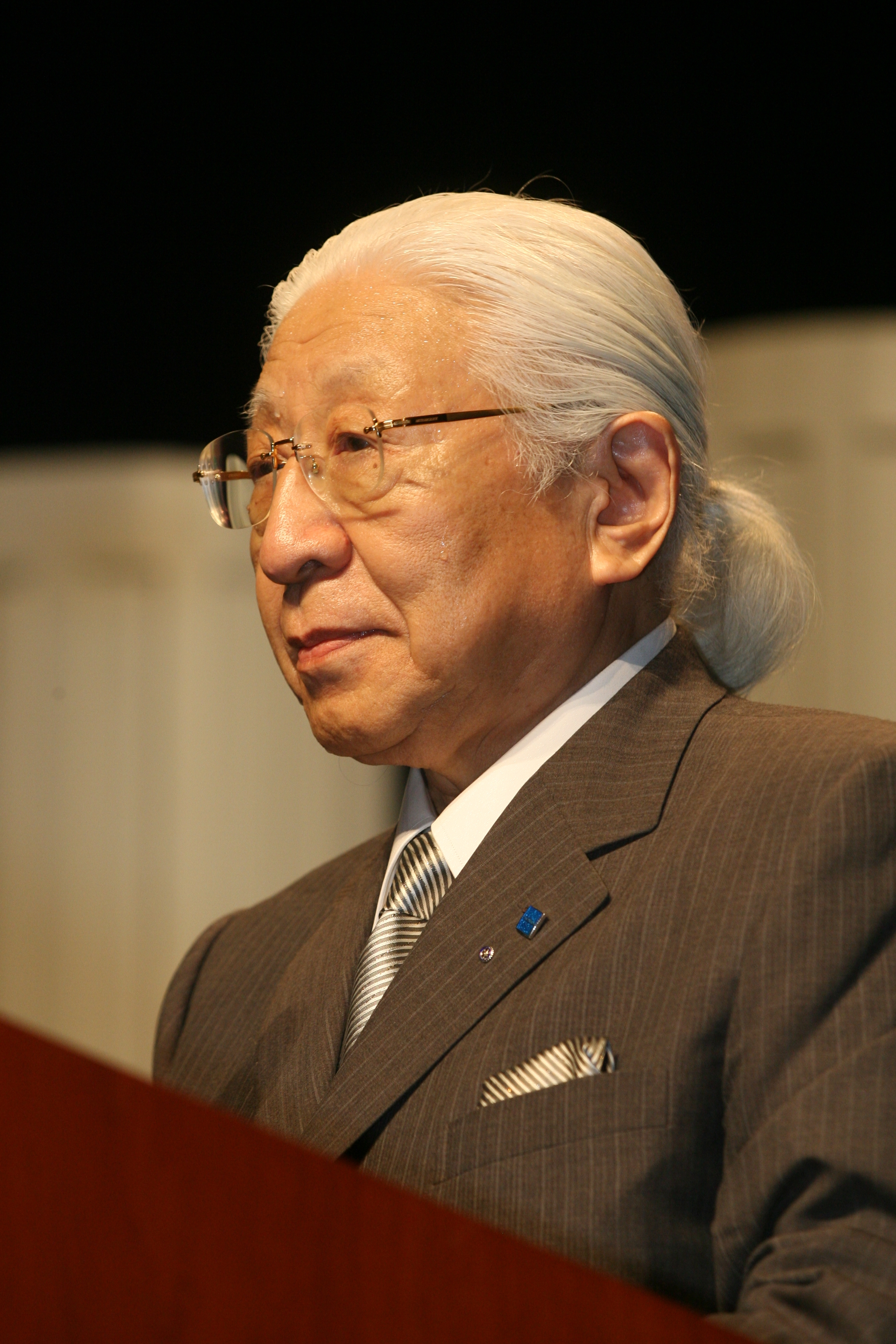
Masao Horiba receiving the 2006 Pittcon Heritage Award

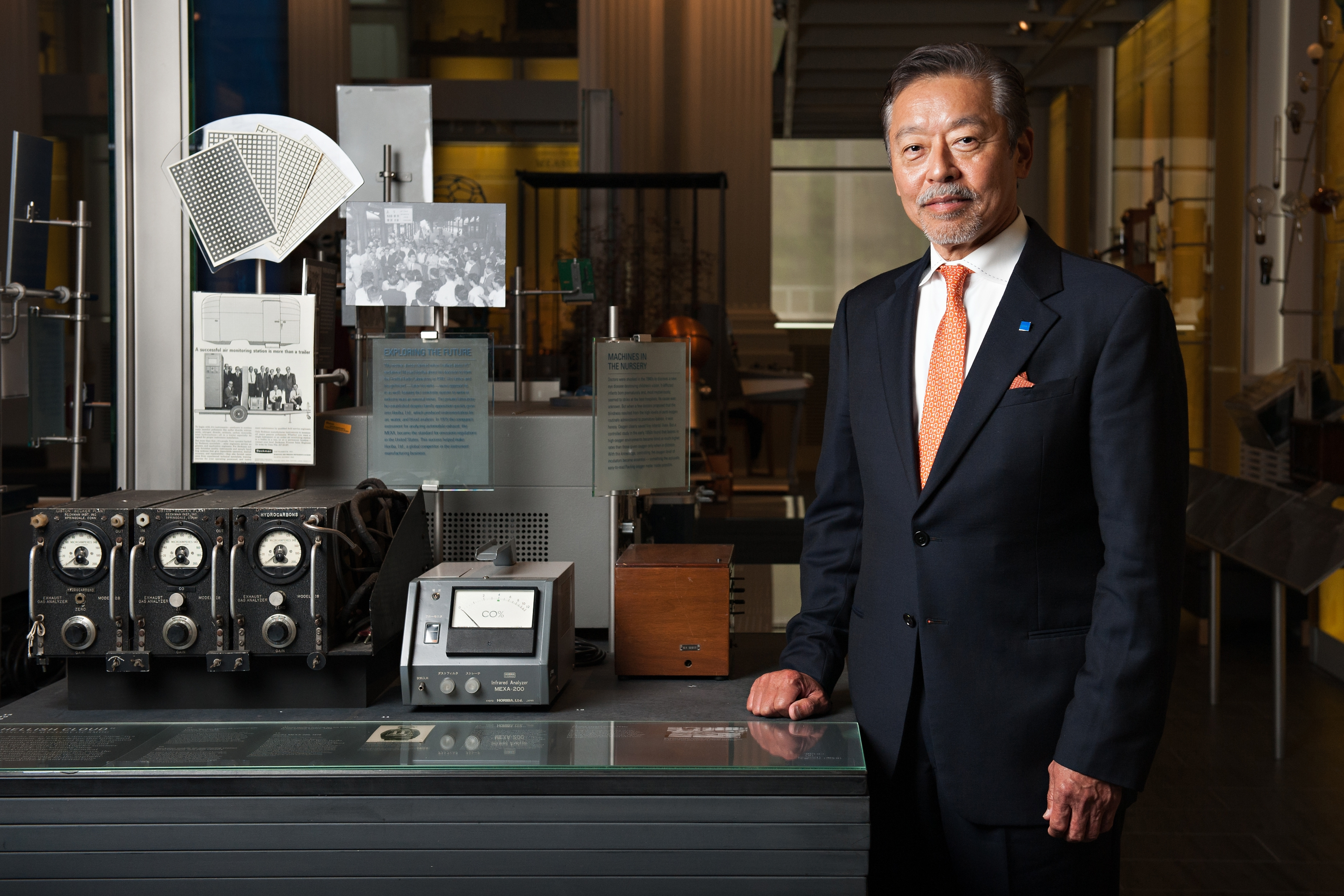
Atsushi Horiba with Mexa200 Analyzer

Horiba was founded in 1945 by Masao Horiba, who graduated in nuclear physics from Kyoto University and in the early 1950s started mass-production of pH meters. The present company was registered in 1953. From 1959 until 2002, Hitachi was a principal shareholder, and the two companies retain close connections.

In 1972, the company established subsidiaries in America and Europe. In 1996–7, Horiba acquired two French companies: the specialist blood cell counter maker ABX SA (currently called Horiba ABX SAS) in 1996, and optical equipment maker Instruments SA (currently Horiba Jobin Yvon SAS) in 1997.

In 2005, Horiba acquired German company Schenck Development Test Systems (including Schenck Pegasus), expanding the automotive market product range to include engine and driveline testing tools, including brake testing and wind-tunnel balances, and the Interautomation Group of Ontario, Canada, with its real-time pre-emptive kernel Linux-based ADACS data acquisition and control software suite.

Horiba's diversification, and establishing of overseas subsidiaries, decoupled Horiba from the stagnant Japanese industrial market, and Japanese domestic sales dropped from 62% of total sales in 1995 to 35% in 2008. The Horiba group now consists of about 42 companies, spread over about 15 countries.

== HORIBA Medical ==
HORIBA Medical
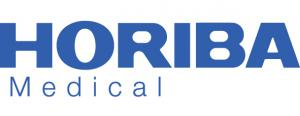

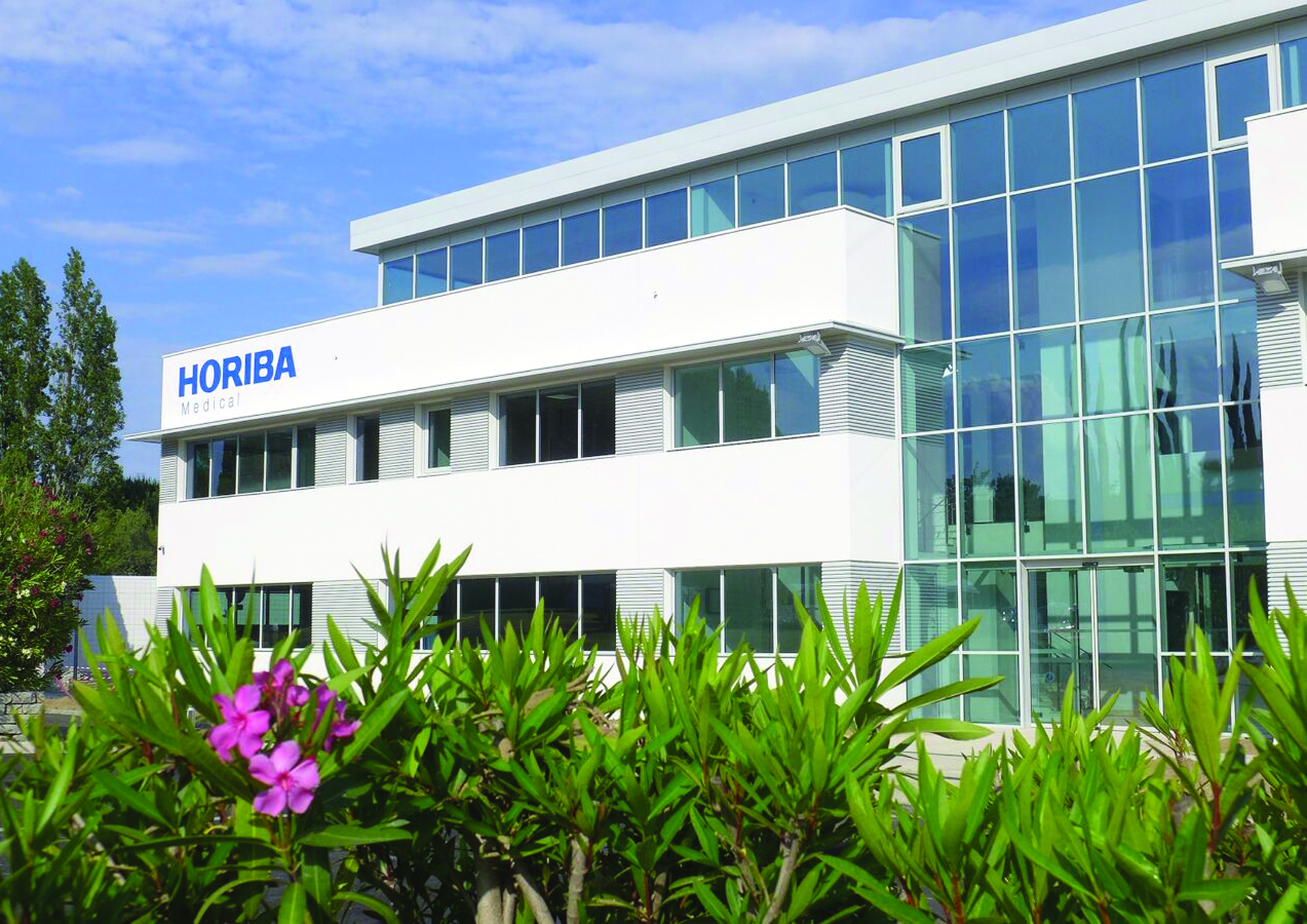
- Masao Horiba Building
- Trade name: HORIBA Medical
- Formerly: HORIBA ABX SAS
- Founded: France (1983; 43 years ago)
- Fate: Acquired by Horiba Group (in 1996)
- Products: In vitro diagnostic instruments
- Parent: Horiba

The HORIBA Medical segment designs and manufactures medical instruments and reagents for the in vitro diagnostics industry. The segment, headquartered in Montpellier (France) is presents on Hematology, clinical chemistry and hemostasis markets in over 110 countries. The 1,080 employees produce 7,500 instruments and 10,000 tons of reagents annually for public and private sectors. Acquired in 1996 by HORIBA Group, the subsidiary was originally named ABX Company, founded in 1983. ABX Company was known for the launch of the smallest hematology analyzer of the world at this time, the Minos. Since joining the Japanese Group HORIBA, segment sales have continued to grow exponentially to reach 210 million of dollars (December 2014).

=== Products ===
The HORIBA Medical Segment manages the entire lifecycle of in vitro diagnostic systems worldwide that are mainly destined for biological analysis in a medical laboratory. These automated analyzers are designed for various users including patients, doctors, private laboratories, clinics and university hospitals.

== Overseas Locations ==
- Austria: Horiba (Austria) GmbH
- Brasil: HORIBA Brasil Holding

HORIBA Instruments (Brasil) Ltda

- Canada: Horiba Automotive Test Systems Inc.
- China: Horiba Instruments (Shanghai) Co., Ltd.

Horiba Trading (Shanghai) Co., Ltd.

- France: HORIBA EUROPE HOLDING

HORIBA ABX SAS
HORIBA France SAS

- Germany: Horiba Automotive Test Systems GmbH

Horiba Europe GmbH
Horiba Europe Automation Division GmbH
Horiba Jobin Yvon GmbH

- India: Horiba India Private Limited
- Italy: Horiba Jobin Yvon Srl
- Japan: Horiba, Ltd.

Horiba STEC, Co., Ltd.
Horiba Advanced Techno Co., Ltd.
Horiba Techno Service Co., Ltd.
Horiba Itech Co., Ltd.

- Korea: Horiba Korea Ltd.

Horiba Automotive Test Systems Ltd.
Horiba STEC Korea, Ltd.

- Poland: Horiba ABX Sp. zo. o.
- Singapore: Horiba Instruments (Singapore) Pte Ltd.
- Thailand: HORIBA Holding (Thailand) Ltd.

HORIBA (Thailand) Ltd.

- UK: HORIBA UK Limited

HORIBA Instruments
HORIBA Jobin Yvon Ltd
HORIBA MIRA Ltd
HORIBA Test Automation Ltd
HORIBA STEC

- USA: Horiba International Corporation

Horiba Instruments Incorporated
Horiba/STEC Incorporated
Horiba Automotive Test Systems Corp.

== Gallery ==
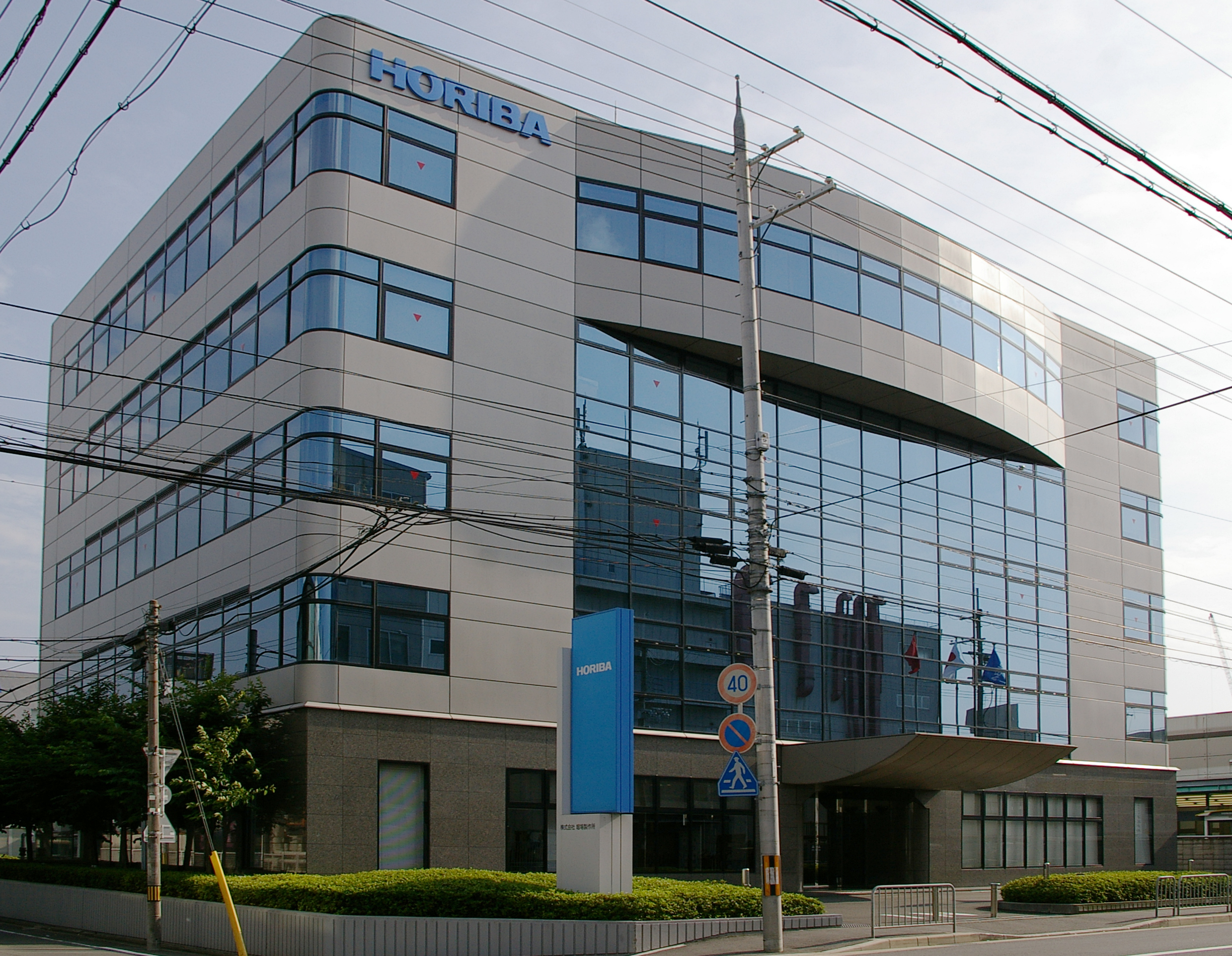
Head office of Horiba in Kyoto, Japan

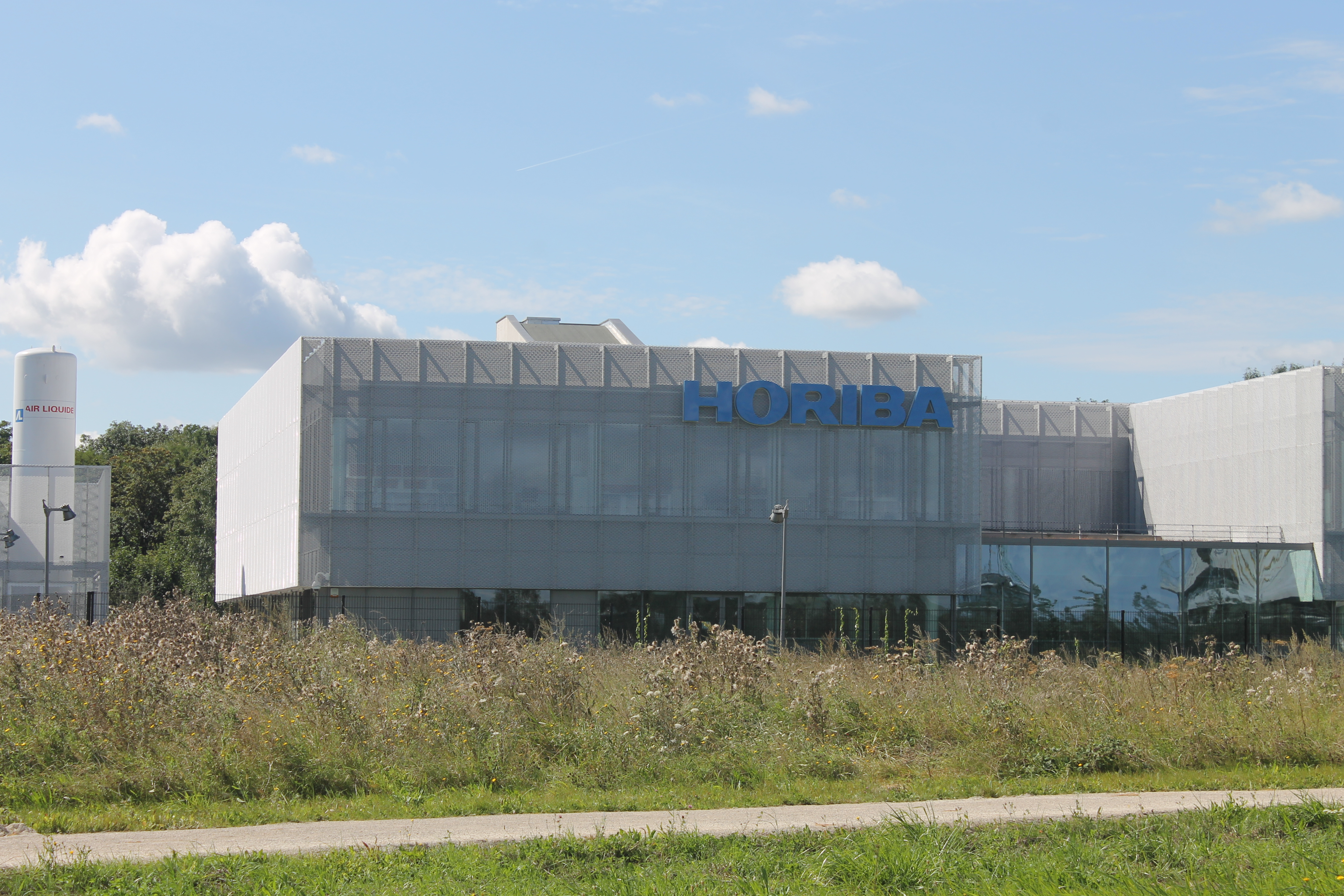
The European headquarters and research center of Horiba in Paris-Saclay, France

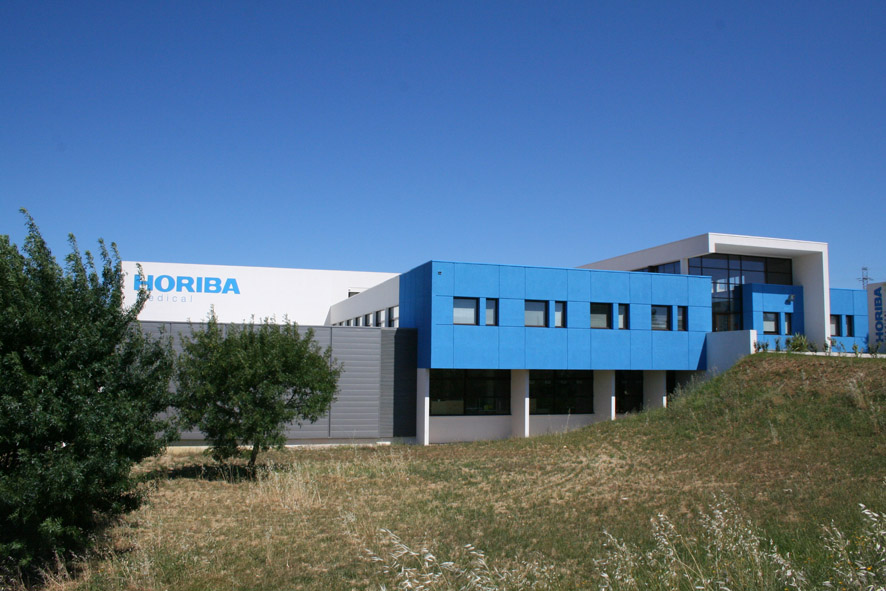
Reagent plant in Montpellier, France

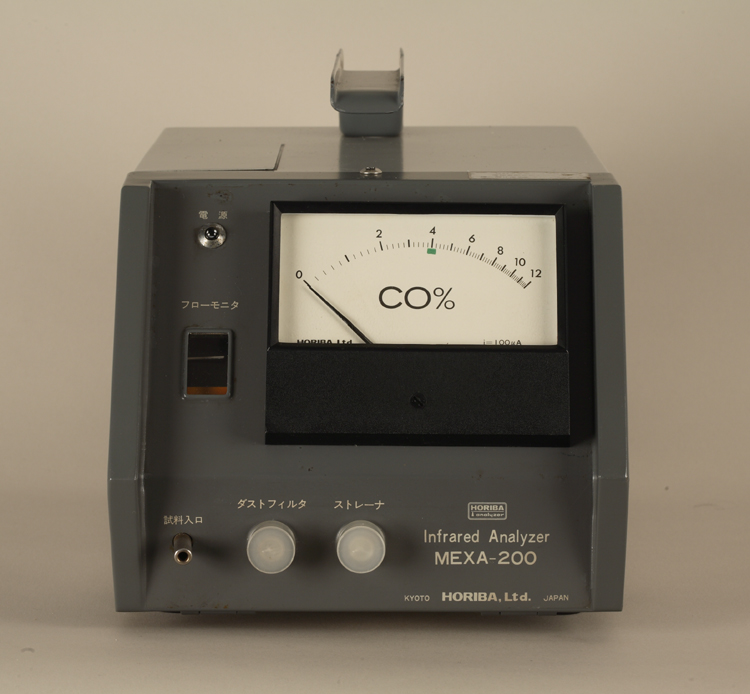
Horiba model MEXA-200 infrared CO analyzer

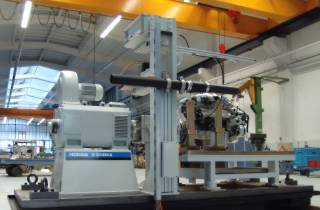
A Horiba engine test stand

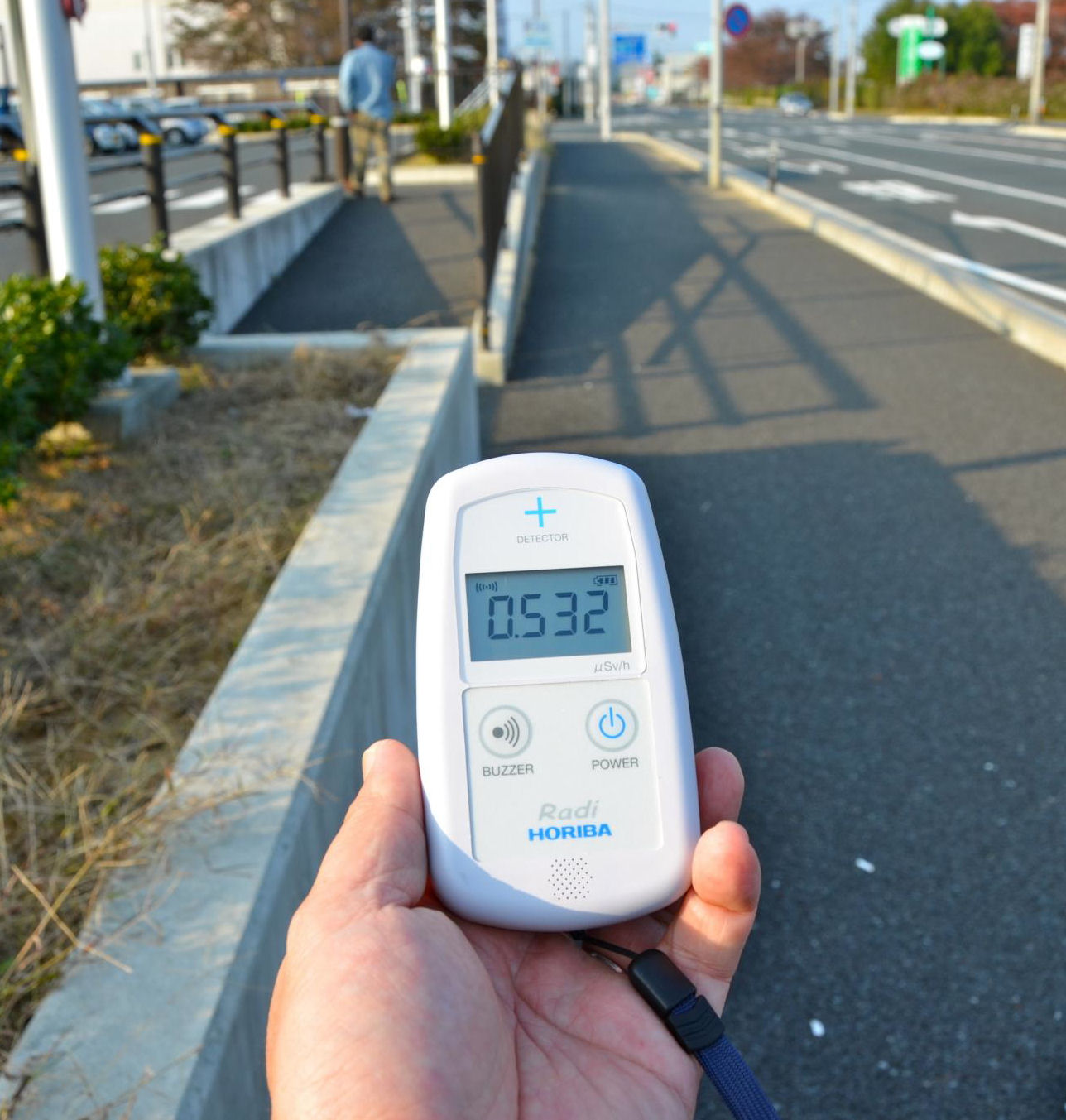
Radiation monitor showing radiation at Minamisōma, Fukushima

== See also ==
- Engine test stand - with information about engine testing
