= Bruna Pellesi =

Italian Roman Catholic nun (1917–1972)

Blessed Bruna Pellesi

Religious
- Born: 11 December 1917; Prignano sulla Secchia, Modena, Kingdom of Italy
- Died: 1 December 1972 (aged 55); Sassuolo, Reggio Emilia, Italy
- Venerated in: Roman Catholic Church
- Beatified: 29 April 2007, Tempio Malatestiano, Rimini, Italy by Cardinal José Saraiva Martins
- Feast: 1 December
- Attributes: Religious habit
- Patronage: Against tuberculosis; Ill people

Blessed Bruna Pellesi (11 November 1917 – 1 December 1972), known as Maria Rosa of Jesus, was an Italian nun who was a member of the Franciscan Missionary Sisters of Christ. Pellesi served as an educator in places such as Sassuolo until she contracted tuberculosis and was moved to various sanatoriums for recuperation until the end of her life when she died in her convent.

Pellesi was beatified under Pope Benedict XVI on 29 April 2007 but it was Cardinal José Saraiva Martins who presided over the celebration in Rimini on the behalf of the pope.

== Life ==
Bruna Pellesi was born on 11 November 1917 in Modena as the last of nine children to farmers and she had at least two brothers. She was baptized as "Bruna Aldina Maria Pellesi" that same November. The death of her two sisters-in law in her adolescence saw her take up farming for a financial income and helped to raise the six small children left behind - all aged four or under.

On 27 August 1940 she joined a Franciscan religious order for nuns and assumed the new religious name of "Maria Rosa of Jesus". She was in religious formation from 1940 until 1942 when she made her first vows in Rimini on 25 September; she assumed the habit of the order on 24 September 1941.

Pellesi graduated as a kindergarten teacher on 11 July 1942. Her first assignment was to teach at the Saint Anne kindergarten in Sassuolo from 30 September 1942 until 19 May 1945 when she began teaching at the local parish school in Ferrara for a few months in 1945 before contracting tuberculosis and being hospitalized on 5 September; in July 1945 she set up a kindergarten. She was hospitalized until 15 November when she was sent to the Pineta sanatorium in Gaiato where she was until 7 December 1948 when she left to enter the CA Pizzardi sanatorium in Bologna - she was there until 1970. She was well enough on 31 August 1947 to make her perpetual vows. Her situation worsened and for relief it was required that pleural fluid be extracted though on 28 October 1955 the needle broke and remained inside of her for the remainder of her life despite numerous useless attempts to extract it.

Pellesi was moved to several sanatoriums and was confined for the remainder of her life in these places in order to combat the disease. Pellesi also made three pilgrimages to Lourdes in France. She also made two solemn consecrations to the Blessed Virgin Mary both on 16 July 1946 and on 8 December 1961 - the latter being on the occasion of the Feast of the Immaculate Conception.

Pellesi died on 1 December 1972 in the Franciscan convent at Sassuolo. She had been allowed to return to the convent on 6 November 1972 though her situation had deteriorated and led to her death. At the time of her death she had been reduced to 43 pounds. She had written a total of 2000 letters to priests and nuns amongst others while all her works were numbered at 2134 pages in total in 16 volumes.

== Beatification ==
The beatification process commenced on 6 March 1981 after the late nun was titled as a Servant of God and the Congregation for the Causes of Saints issued the official "nihil obstat" to the cause which would allow it to proceed first on a diocesan level; this cognitional process was opened on 2 February 1982 and concluded on 2 February 1987 while receiving C.C.S. validation on 2 December 1988 in Rome. The C.C.S. later received the Positio dossier from the postulation in 1992 for assessment.

Theologians issued their approval to the dossier's contents on 21 December 1999 which allowed for the C.C.S. to deliver their own positive approval on 4 April 2000. Pellesi was named as Venerable on 1 July 2000 after Pope John Paul II confirmed that the late nun had lived a model life of heroic virtue. The miracle needed for beatification was investigated before receiving C.C.S. approval on 30 January 2004 and later the positive approval from the medical board on 14 April 2005. Theologians also voiced their assent on 16 September 2005 as did the C.C.S. on 4 April 2006. Pope Benedict XVI - on 28 June 2006 - approved the healing to be a credible miracle and approved the beatification to take place. The pontiff delegated Cardinal José Saraiva Martins to preside over the beatification on his behalf on 29 April 2007 in Rimini.

The current postulator assigned to this cause is Fra Carlo Calloni.
