= Freeman V. Horner =

Freeman Victor Horner
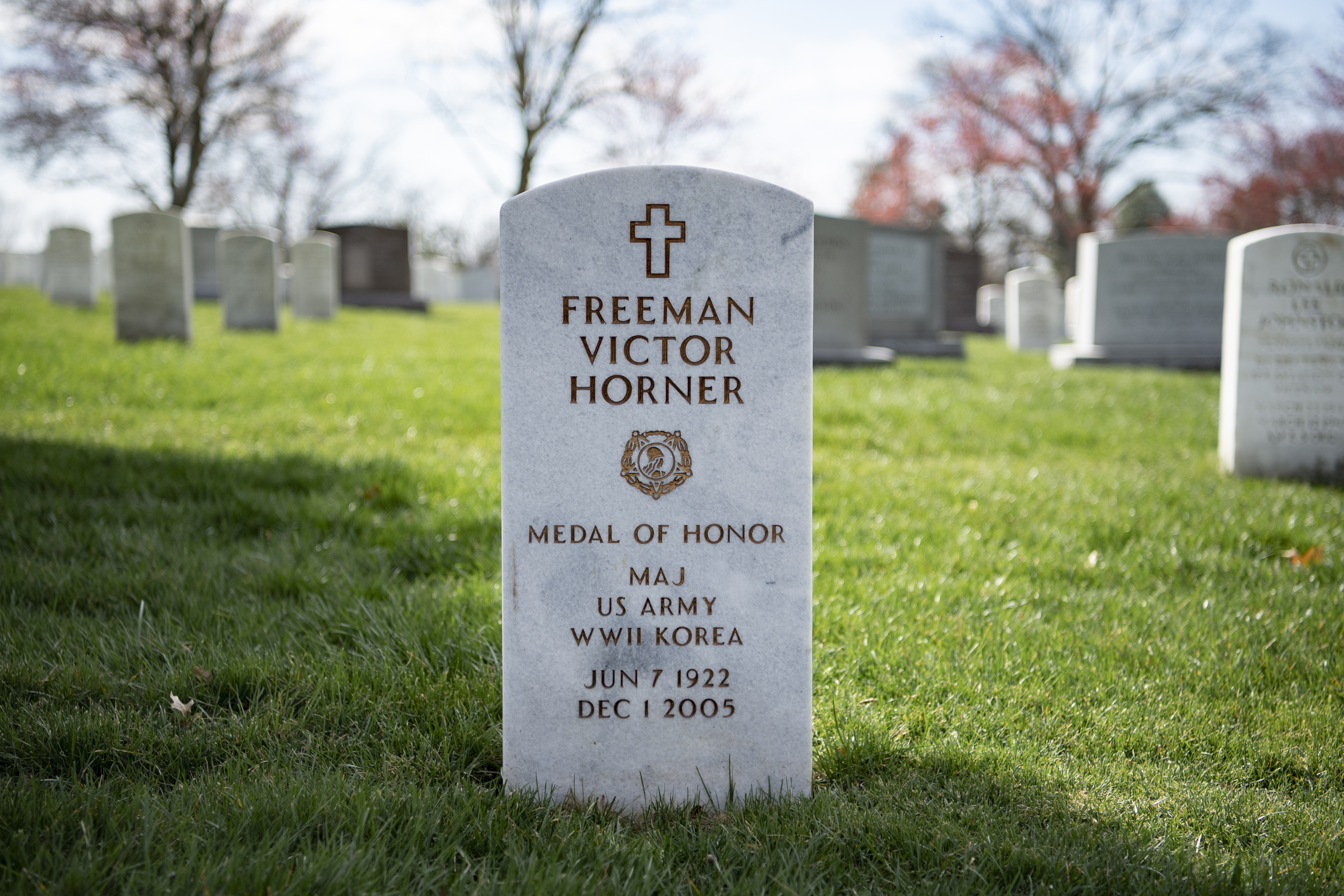
- Grave at Arlington National Cemetery
- Born: June 7, 1922; Mount Carmel, Pennsylvania
- Died: December 1, 2005 (aged 83); Columbus, Georgia
- Burial place: Arlington National Cemetery
- Military career
- Allegiance: United States
- Branch: United States Army
- Rank: Major
- Units: 119th Infantry Regiment, 30th Infantry Division
- Conflicts: World War II; Korean War
- Awards: Medal of Honor

Freeman Victor Horner (June 7, 1922 – December 1, 2005) was a United States Army officer and a recipient of the United States military's highest decoration—the Medal of Honor—for his actions in World War II.

== Biography ==
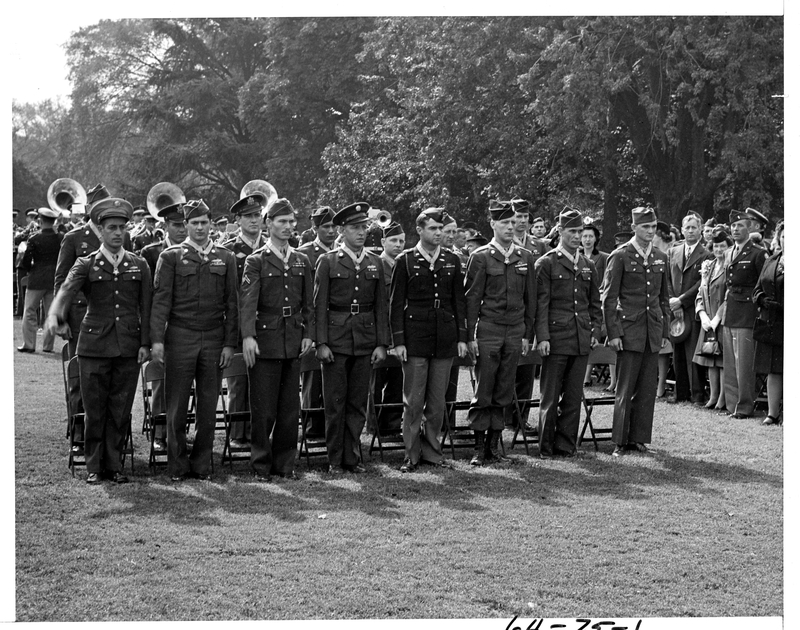
Horner (front row, second from left) was one of 15 members of the U.S. Army who received the Medal of Honor from President Harry S. Truman at the White House on October 12, 1945.

Horner joined the army from Shamokin, Pennsylvania, in January 1941, and by November 16, 1944, was serving as a staff sergeant in Company K, 119th Infantry Regiment, 30th Infantry Division. On that day, in Würselen, Germany, he single-handedly attacked three German machine gun positions and killed or captured the soldiers manning them. For these actions, he was awarded the Medal of Honor a year later, on October 12, 1945.

Horner reached the commissioned officer rank of major and served in the Korean War before leaving the Army. He died at age 83 in Columbus, Georgia. A section of U.S. Route 27 in Cataula, Georgia, as well as Georgia Route 219 in Columbus, Georgia, was named for him. He was married to Joyce Farmer Lott, who cared for him after his 1990 brain aneurysm. He was buried at Arlington National Cemetery.

== Medal of Honor citation ==
Horner's official Medal of Honor citation reads:

S/Sgt. Horner and other members of his company were attacking Wurselen, Germany, against stubborn resistance on 16 November 1944, when machinegun fire from houses on the edge of the town pinned the attackers in flat, open terrain 100 yards from their objective. As they lay in the field, enemy artillery observers directed fire upon them, causing serious casualties. Realizing that the machineguns must be eliminated in order to permit the company to advance from its precarious position, S/Sgt. Horner voluntarily stood up with his submachine gun and rushed into the teeth of concentrated fire, burdened by a heavy load of ammunition and hand grenades. Just as he reached a position of seeming safety, he was fired on by a machinegun which had remained silent up until that time. He coolly wheeled in his fully exposed position while bullets barely missed him and killed 2 hostile gunners with a single, devastating burst. He turned to face the fire of the other 2 machineguns, and dodging fire as he ran, charged the 2 positions 50 yards away. Demoralized by their inability to hit the intrepid infantryman, the enemy abandoned their guns and took cover in the cellar of the house they occupied. S/Sgt. Horner burst into the building, hurled 2 grenades down the cellar stairs, and called for the Germans to surrender. Four men gave up to him. By his extraordinary courage, S/Sgt. Horner destroyed 3 enemy machinegun positions, killed or captured 7 enemy, and cleared the path for his company's successful assault on Wurselen.

== Awards and decorations ==

Badge	Combat Infantryman Badge		
1st row	Medal of Honor		
2nd row	Bronze Star Medal	Purple Heart	Army Good Conduct Medal with one good conduct loop
3rd row	American Campaign Medal	American Campaign Medal	European–African–Middle Eastern Campaign Medal with 3 campaign stars
4th row	World War II Victory Medal	Army of Occupation Medal	National Defense Service Medal

== See also ==
- List of Medal of Honor recipients for World War II
