= Pittcon Heritage Award =

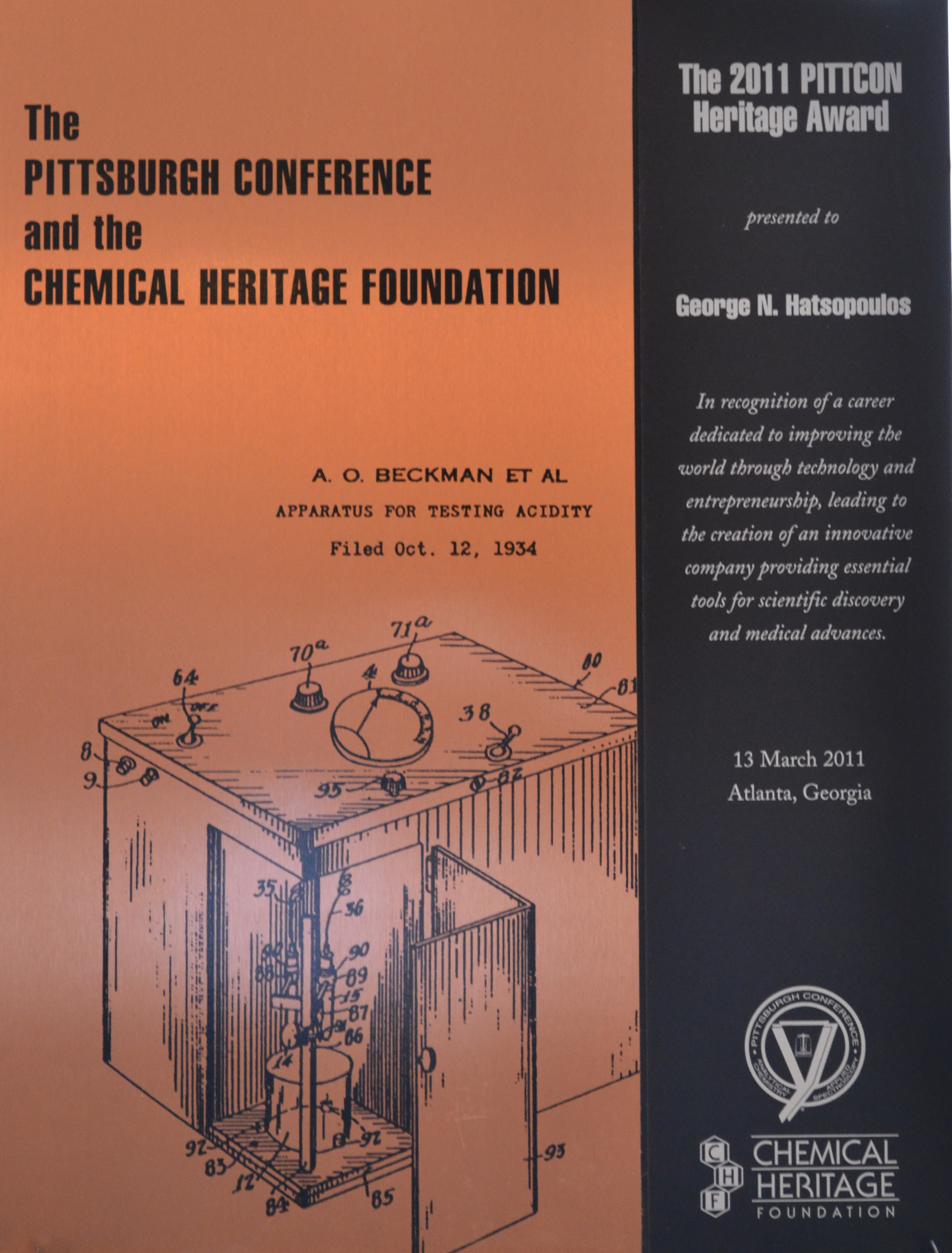
- Awarded for: Outstanding individuals whose entrepreneurial careers shaped the instrumentation and laboratory supplies community.
- Date: 2002
- Country: International
- Presented by: Pittsburgh Conference on Analytical Chemistry and Applied Spectroscopy, Science History Institute

The Pittcon Heritage Award recognizes "outstanding individuals whose entrepreneurial careers shaped the instrumentation and laboratory supplies community." The award is jointly sponsored by the Pittsburgh Conference on Analytical Chemistry and Applied Spectroscopy (Pittcon) and the Science History Institute (formerly the Chemical Heritage Foundation). The award is presented annually at a special ceremony during Pittcon.

== Recipients ==
The award is given yearly and was first presented in 2002.

- 2025 Jeanette Grasselli Brown, director of corporate research of Standard Oil of Ohio (now BP America)
- 2020 Stan Stearns, founder and director of research of VICI Valco Instruments and related companies
- 2019 Nicholas Pelick and Walter Supina, Supelco
- 2018 Michael Morris, SpectrEcology and Ocean Optics
- 2017 Robert J. Warren, LECO
- 2016 Kenji Kazato and Kazuo Ito, JEOL
- 2015 A. Blaine Bowman, Dionex (later acquired by Thermo Fisher Scientific)
- 2014 Lynwood W. Swanson, FEI Company, USA
- 2013 Günther Laukien, Bruker Physik AG, Germany; (Bruker Corporation), USA
- 2012 Genzo Shimadzu, Sr., and Genzo Shimadzu, Jr., Shimadzu Corporation, Japan
- 2011 George Hatsopoulos, John Hatsopoulos, and Arvin Smith, Thermo Electron, USA
- 2010 Walter Jennings, University of California, Davis, J&W Scientific, USA
- 2009 Alfred R. Bader, Aldrich Chemical Company (Sigma-Aldrich Corporation), USA
- 2008 Leroy Hood, Institute for Systems Biology, USA
- 2007 David Schwartz, Bio-Rad Laboratories, USA
- 2006 Masao Horiba, Horiba, Japan
- 2005 Robert W. Allington, Instrumentation Specialties Co. (Teledyne ISCO), USA
- 2004 Paul A. Wilks, Jr., Wilks Enterprises, USA
- 2003 Kathryn Hach-Darrow, Hach Company, USA
- 2002 David Nelson, Nelson Analytical Systems, USA

=== Photo gallery ===
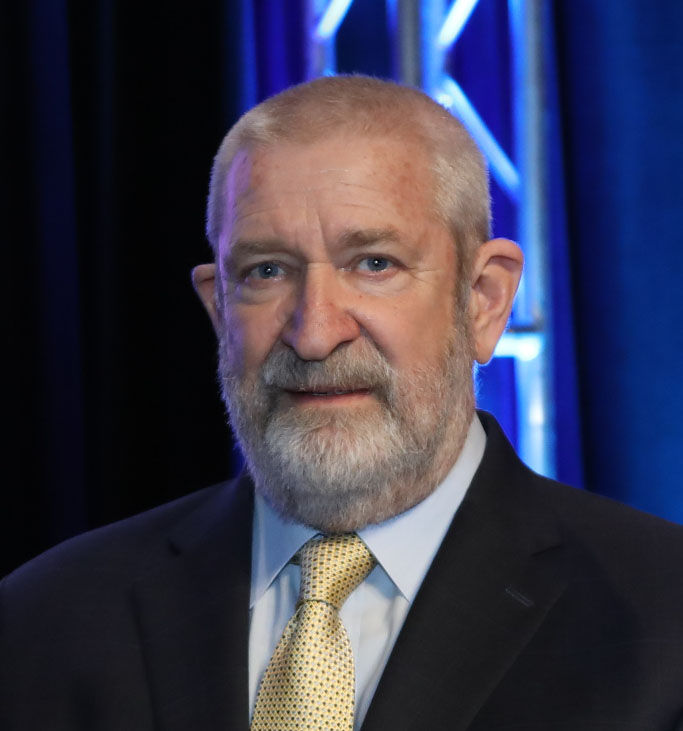
Michael Morris, 2018

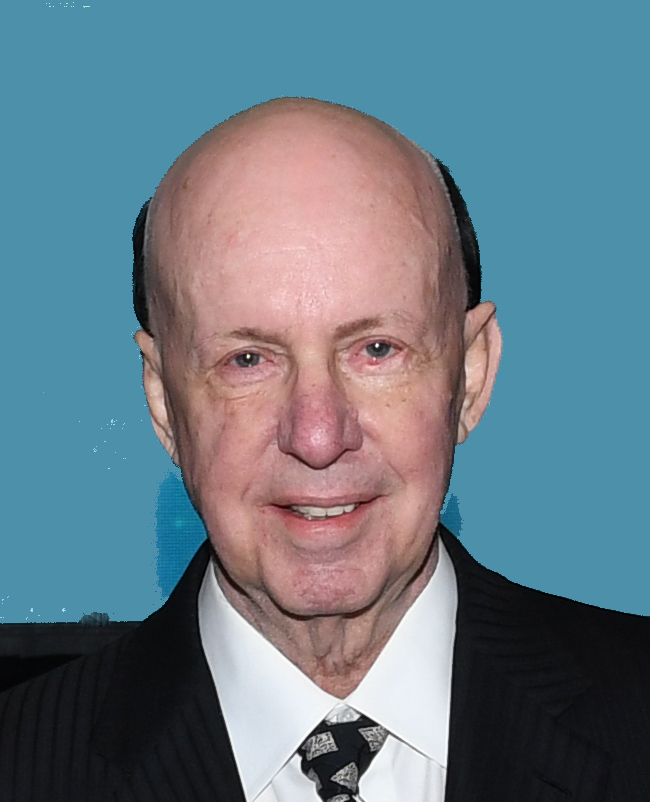
Robert J. Warren, 2017

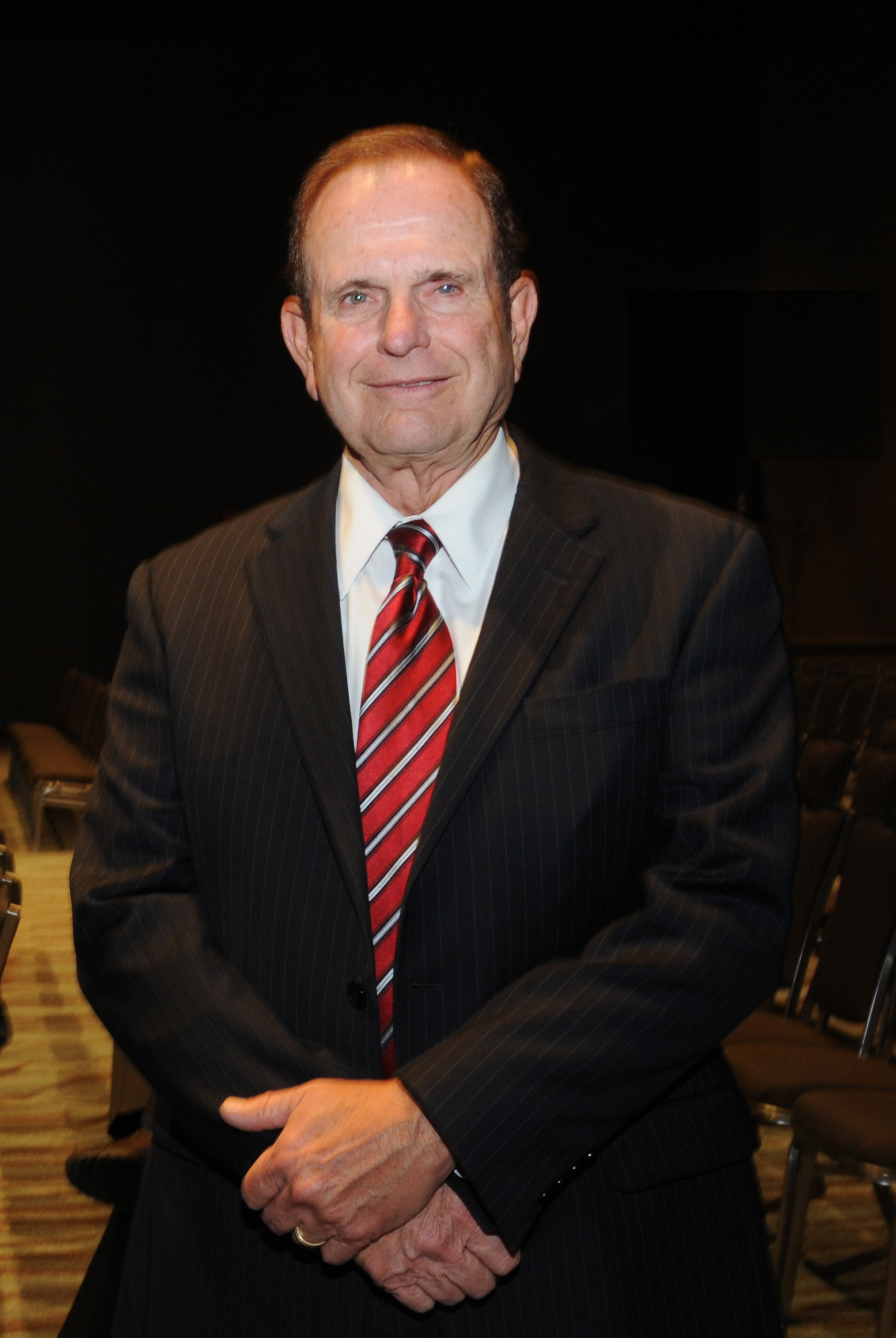
A. Blaine Bowman, 2015

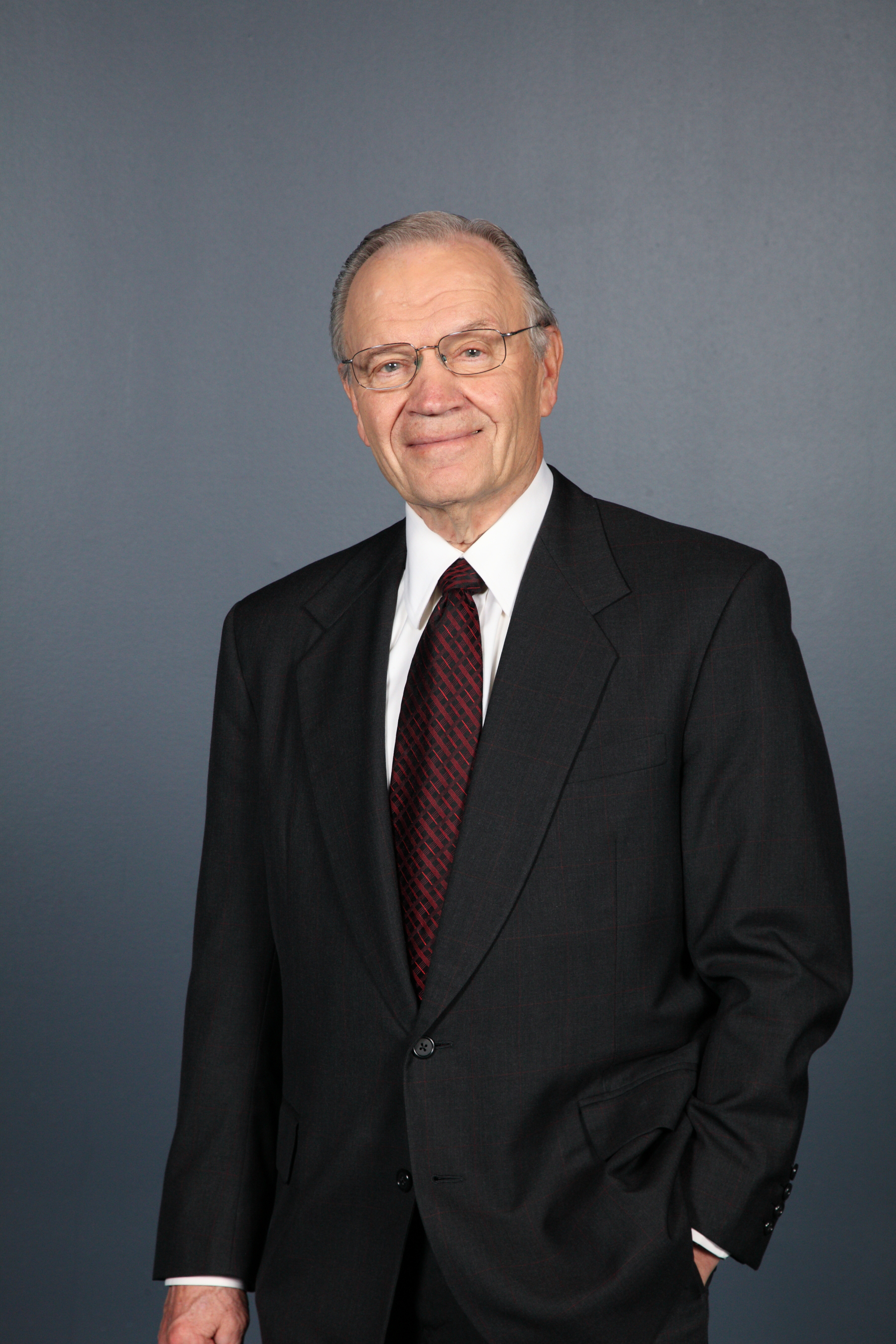
Lynwood W. Swanson, 2014

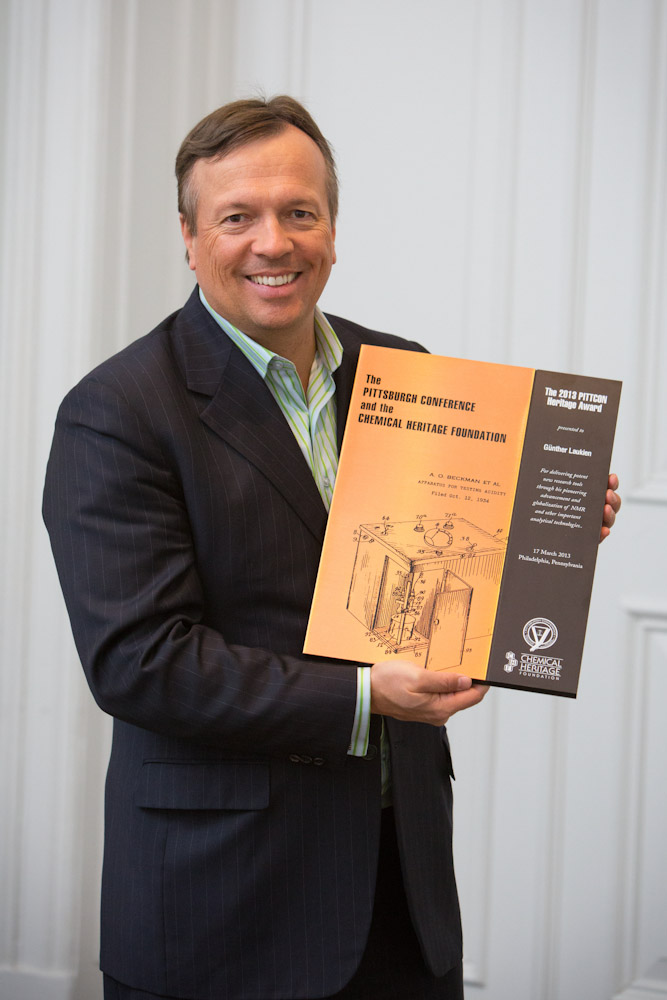
Frank Laukien, receiving award for Gunther Laukien, 2013

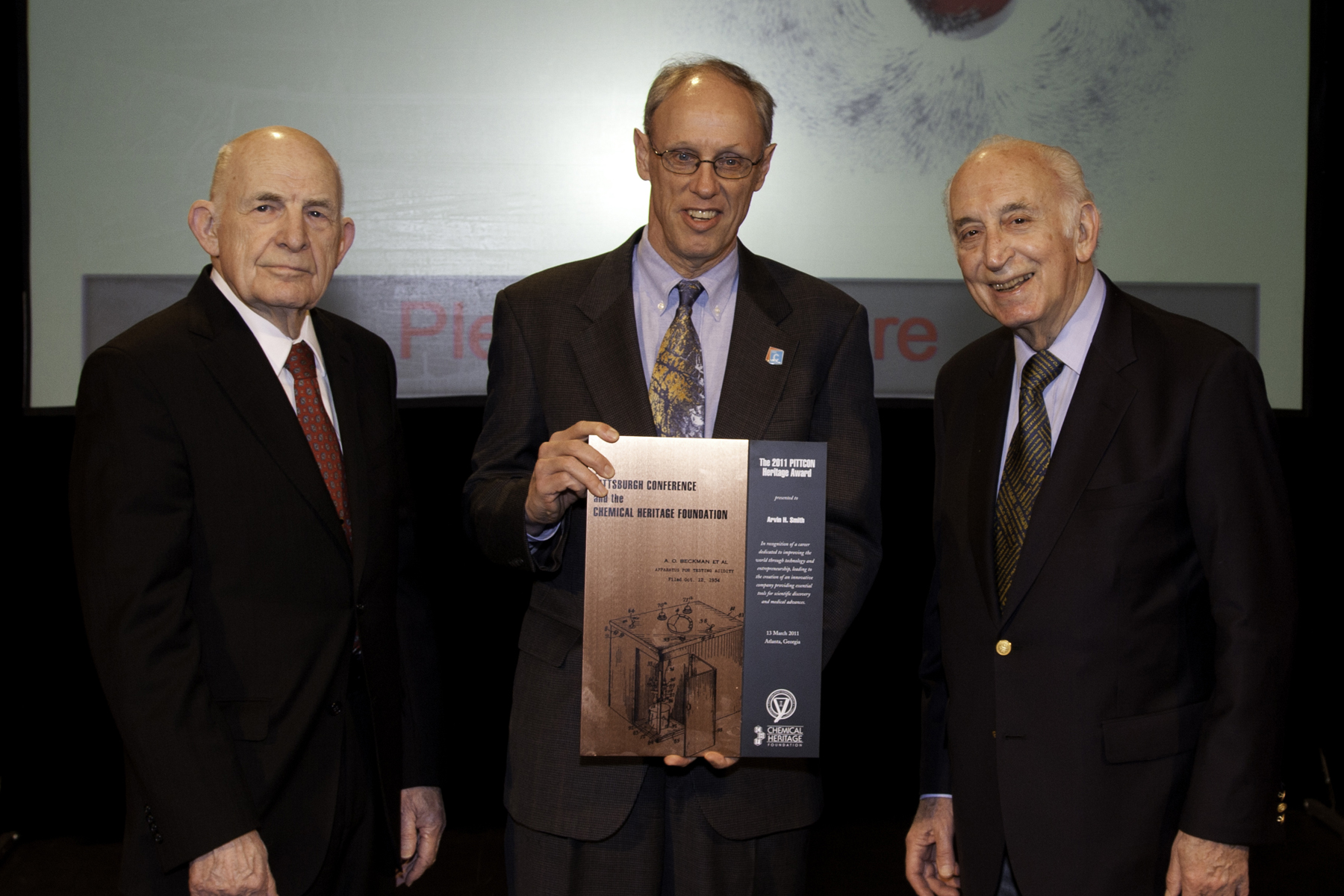
Arvin Smith (left), George Hatsopoulos (right), receiving award from Tom Tritton (center), 2011

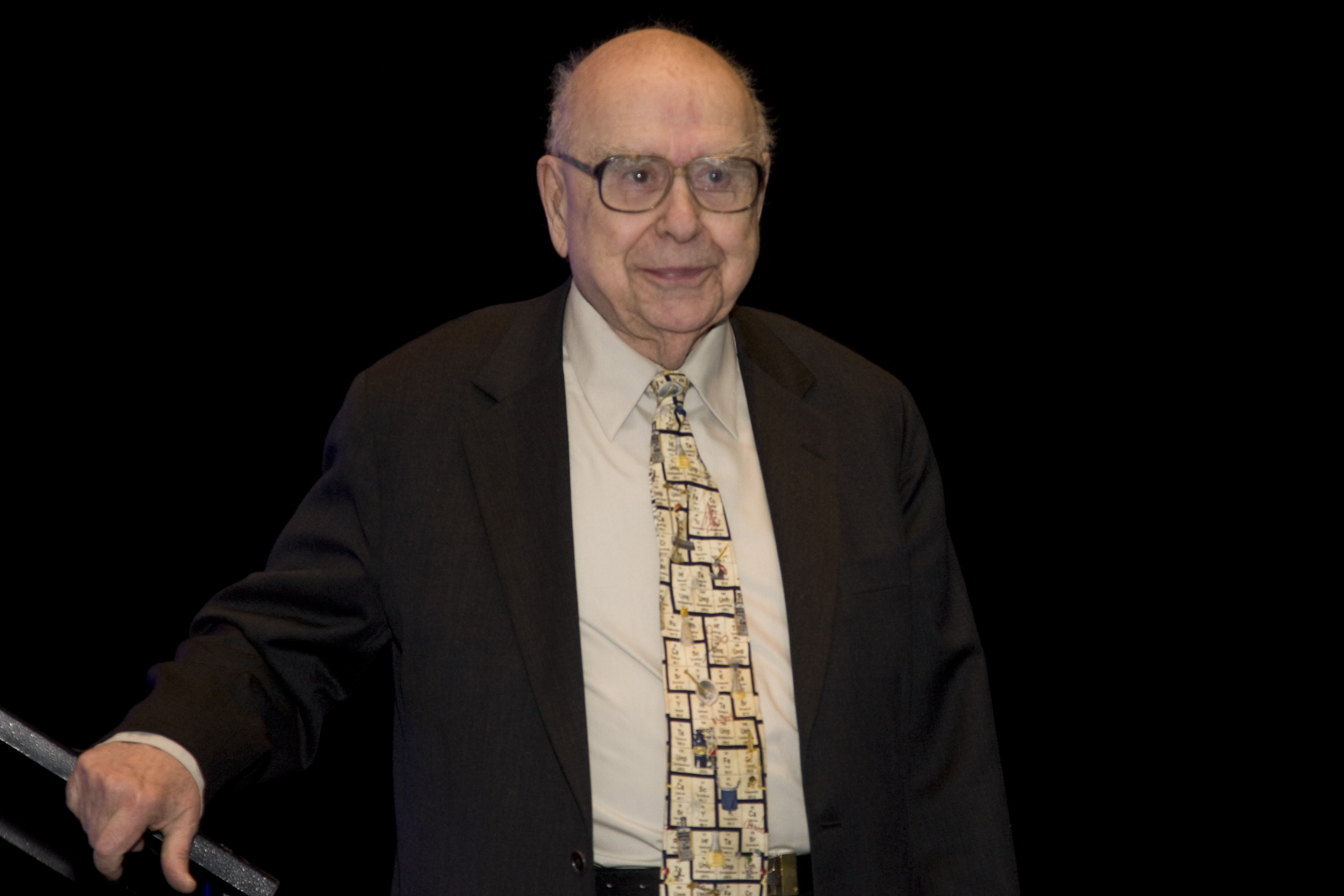
Alfred R. Bader, 2009

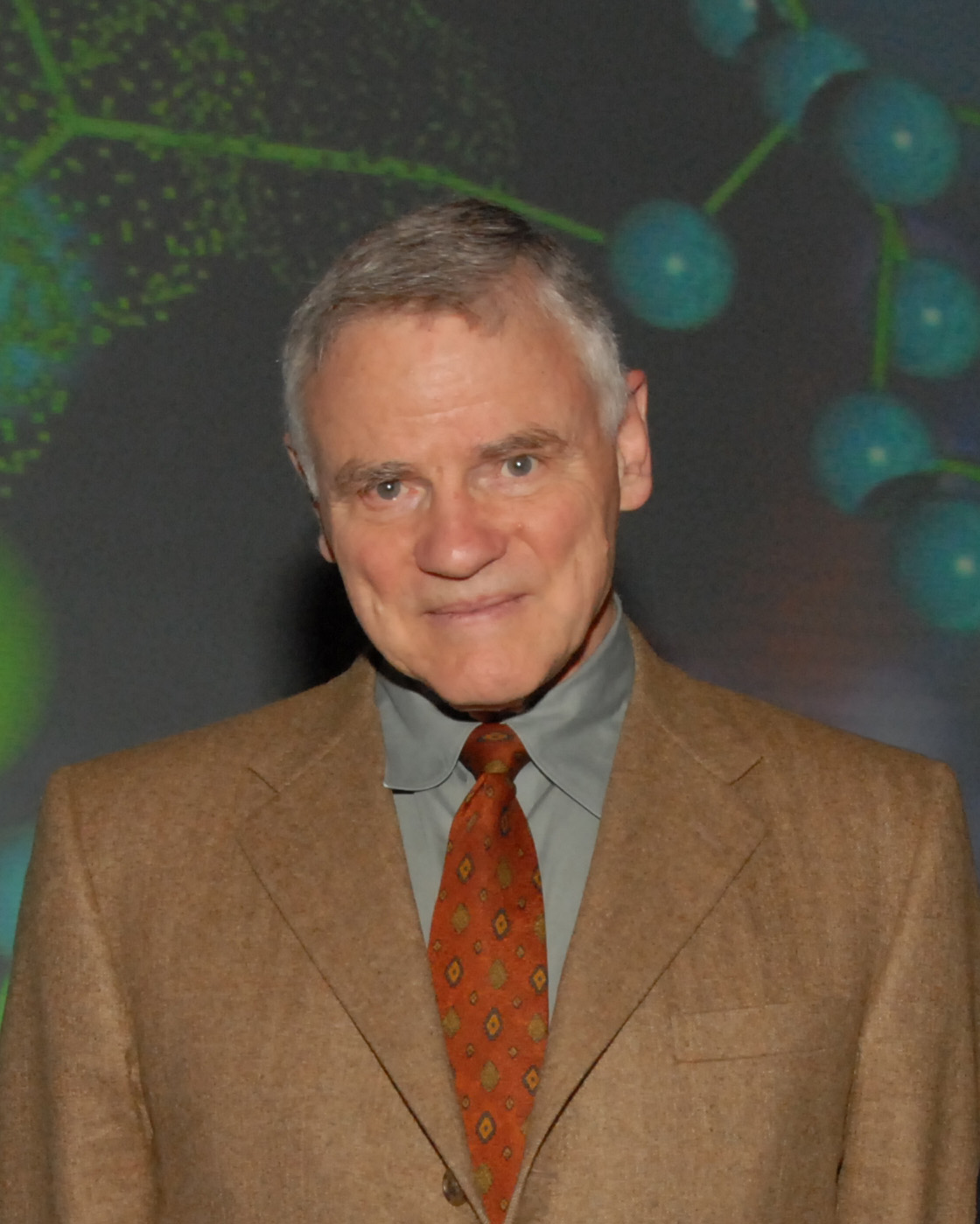
Leroy Hood, 2008

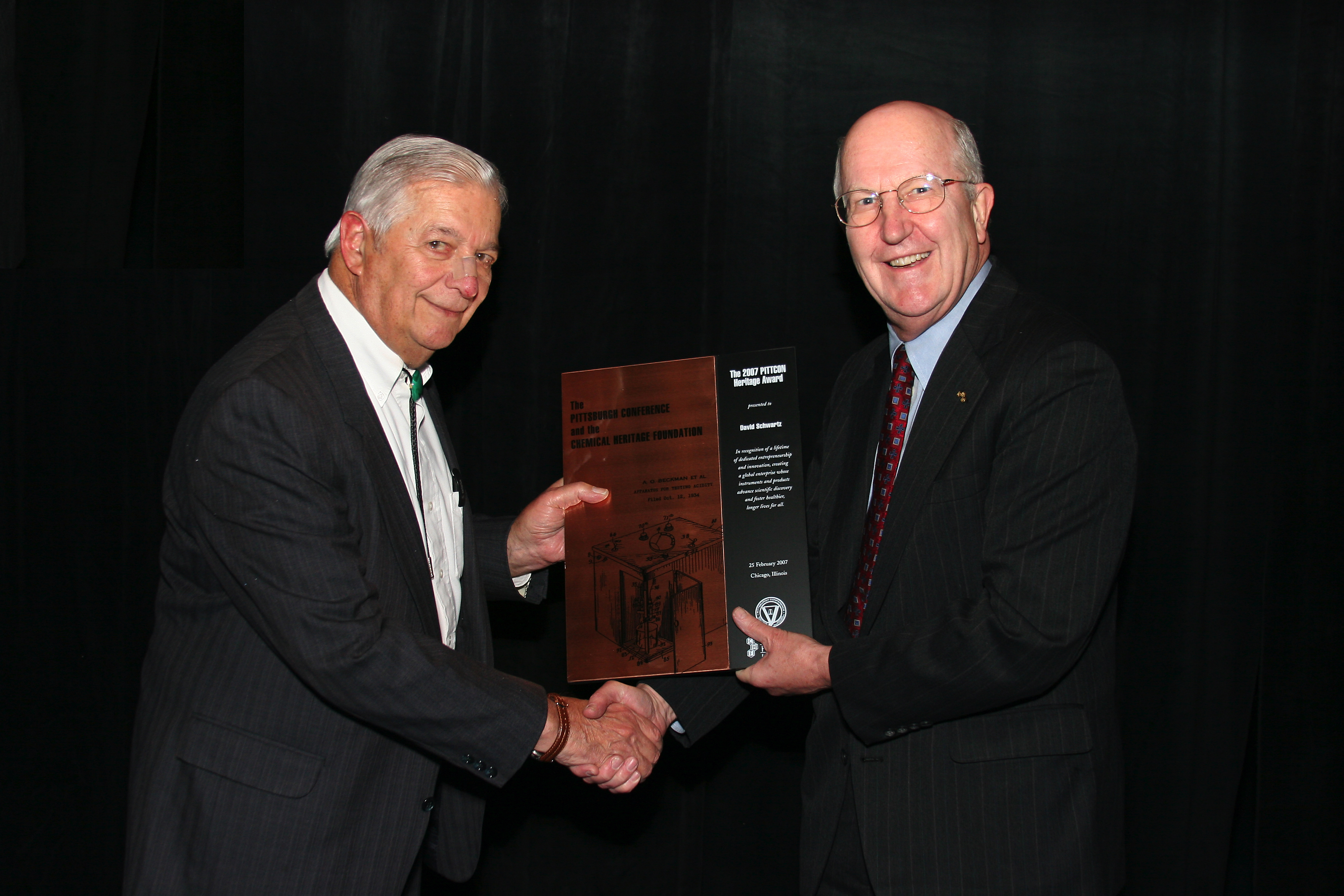
David Schwartz (left) receiving award from Arnold Thackray (right), 2007

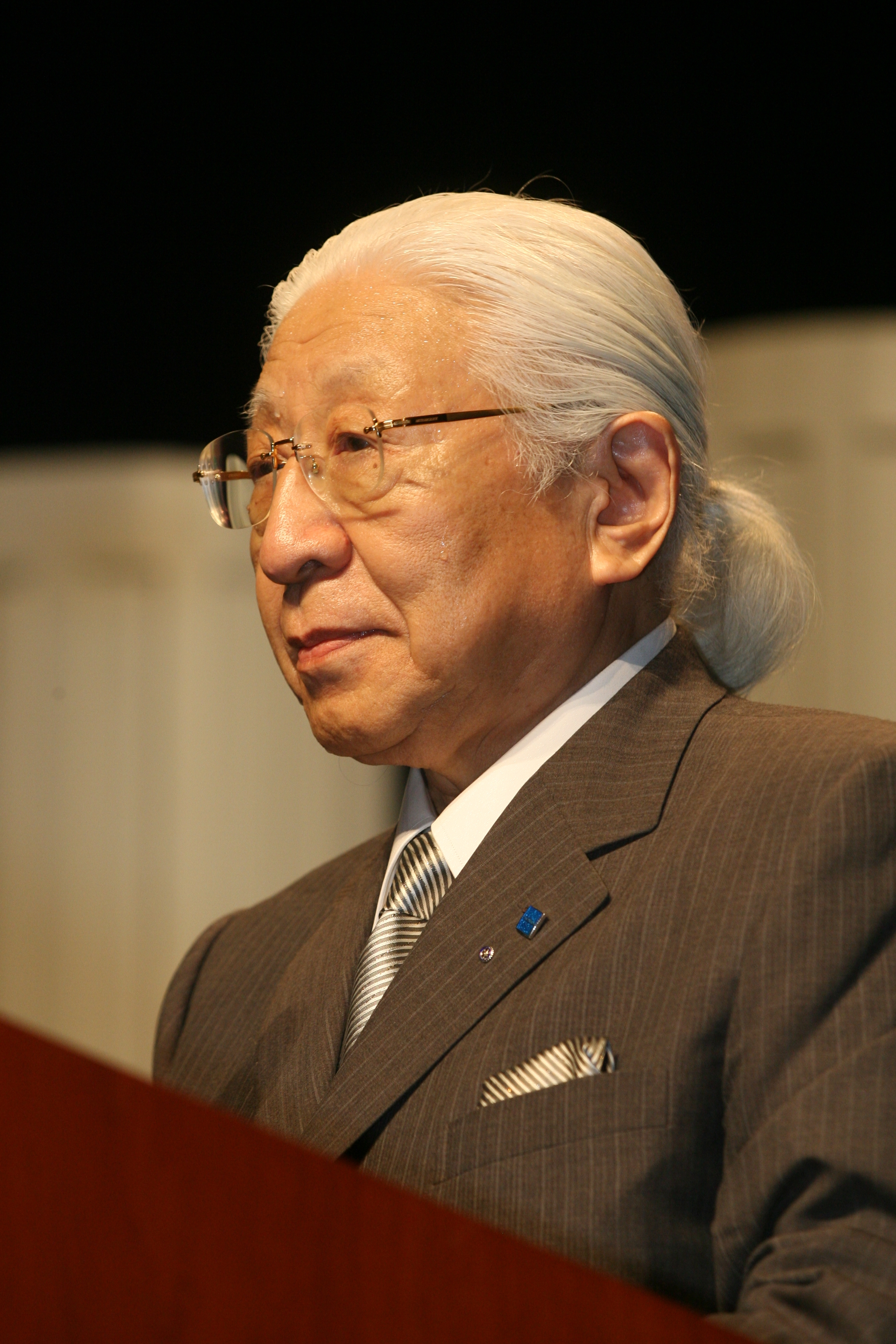
Masao Horiba, 2006

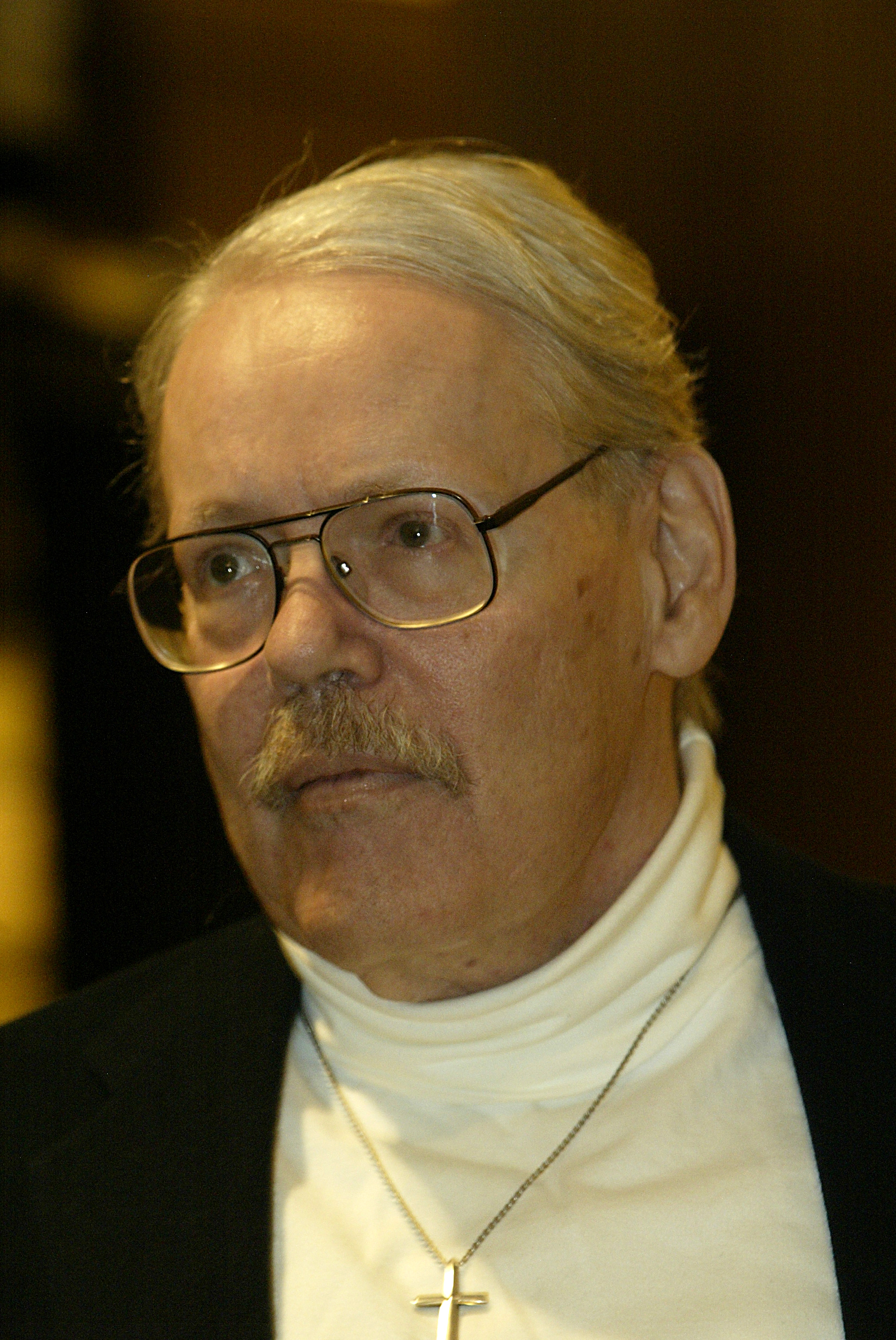
Robert W. Allington, 2005

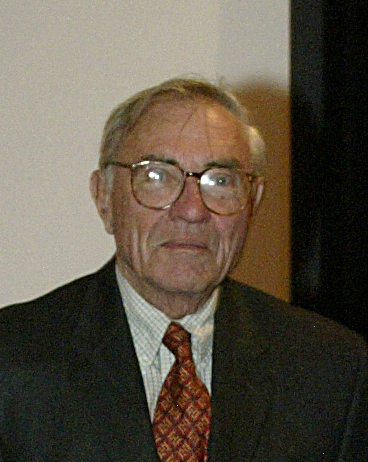
Paul A. Wilks, 2004 (photo taken 2005)

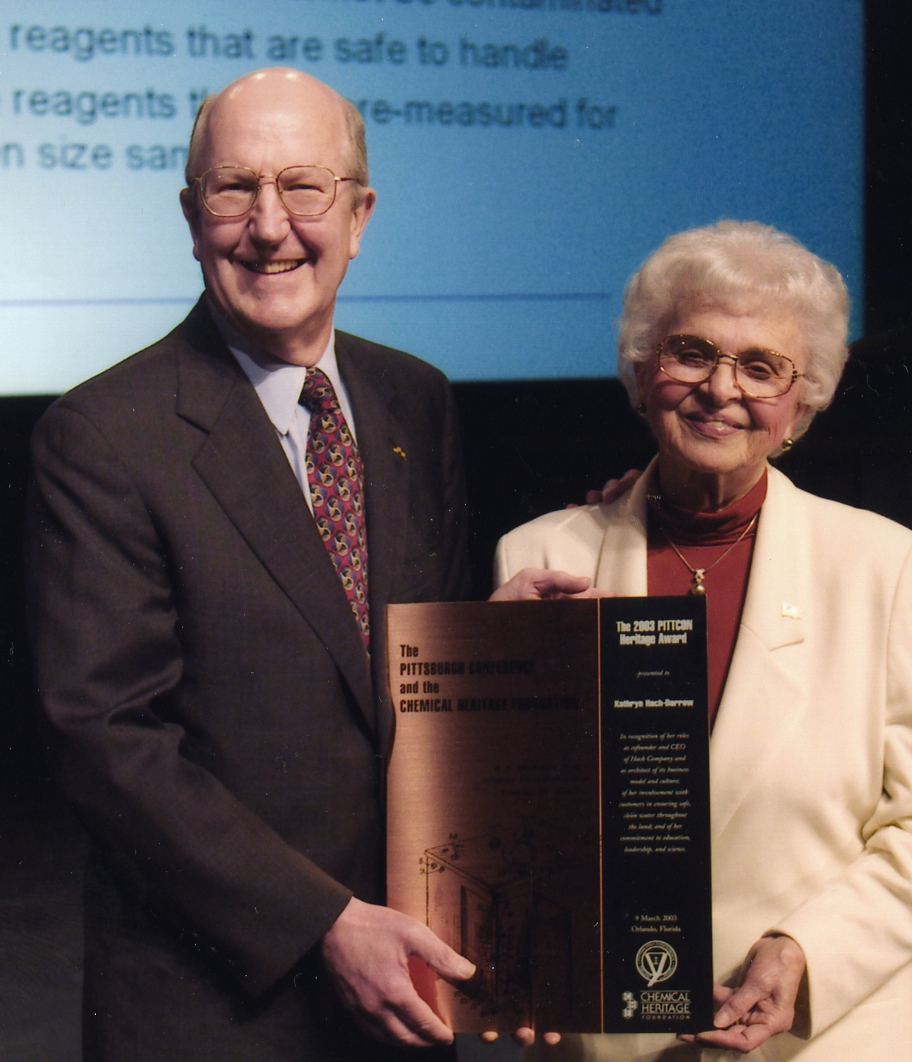
Kitty Hach-Darrow, 2003

== See also ==
- List of chemistry awards
