= Pittcon Editors' Awards =

Pittcon Editors’ Awards honoured the best new products on show at the Pittsburgh Conference on Analytical Chemistry and Applied Spectroscopy, or Pittcon, for 20 years from 1996 having been established by Dr Gordon Wilkinson, managing editor of Analytical Instrument Industry Report (later Instrumenta). On 8 March 2015, the event returned to the Morial Convention Center in New Orleans and this was the last occasion when the awards were presented.

The independent awards, which represented the results of an informal poll of leading editors, had become an important feature of the world's largest trade show for the laboratory equipment industry. Pittcon organisers and media center supported the scheme and provided details and photographs on the exhibition's Press and Media Information page. In 2016 the group of editors and journalists that formed the core of the judging panel reluctantly decided to discontinue the awards program citing gradually dwindling support from ever-busier media representatives.

== History and organisation ==
The awards were started because of the challenge that editors faced of effectively covering the trade show, which in 2015 hosted 925 exhibitors. New exhibitors at the Morial Convention Center totalled 130 companies. Walking past every booth at an event such as this represents a trek of over 10 kilometres (6.2 mi).

Accredited media representatives, of whom there were more than 150 per year, were invited to list up to three new products on a nomination form provided on registration at the Media Center. Editors were invited to attend a judging session towards the end of the trade show. They reviewed entries and voted on the nominated products. The only criterion was that products must have appeared at the exhibition for the first time, but winning products usually featured innovations in technology or industrial design, or enabled new analytical applications.

Gold, Silver and Bronze winners were determined and plaques were awarded to the booth personnel of the winning companies on the final morning of the four-day exposition. Other nominated products received an Honourable Mention.

== Award winners ==
Winners for the period 1996 to 2015, together with the names of their products, are listed below. Of the award winners, the majority were the largest instrument makers in the industry, but over 30 small companies or start-ups went home with awards, illustrating that editors were able to use their technical expertise to spot innovations irrespective of the marketing budgets of exhibitors.

Company names are listed in the format used at the date of the award, although may have now changed as a result of change of ownership. Trademarks are acknowledged, but not indicated; readers should check corporate literature or websites for current intellectual property rights. Web links are only provided for award-winning products up to five years old. Products introduced earlier have usually been updated with more recent models.

2015:

- Gold - Shimadzu Corp. - Nexera UC fully automated supercritical fluid extraction - supercritical fluid chromatography - mass spectrometry system;
- Silver - Waters Corp. - Full Spectrum Molecular Imaging integrating MALDI, DESI, and ion mobility mass spectrometry techniques and informatics workflows into a single system;
- Bronze – Grenova LLC - TipNovus bench-top, high throughput washing device

2014:

- Gold - Texas Instruments Inc. - DLP4500NIR and the DLP NIRscan chip-based NIR polychromator and evaluation module;
- Silver - Waters Corp. - AQUITY QDa mass detector for chromatography;
- Bronze – AB Sciex LLC - CESI-MS system using capillary electrophoresis combined with electrospray ionisation mass spectrometry.

2013:

- Gold - Senova Systems - pHit Scanner calibration-free pH meter;
- Silver - Optofluidics - Molecular NanoTweezer microscope attachment;
- Bronze – APIX Technology - miniaturised gas chromatography system, and PIE Photonics - Pie-in-a-Box passive interferometer engine.

2012:

- Gold - Waters - ACQUITY UPC (UltraPerformance Convergence Chromatography);
- Silver - Bruker - SCION TQ triple quadrupole GC/MS instrument;
- Bronze – Protea Biosciences - DP1000 direct ion source for mass spectrometry.

2011:

- Gold - LECO - Citius LC-MS; and WITec - True Surface Microscopy Raman spectrometer;
- Silver - EMD Millipore - Samplicity filtration system;
- Bronze – AstraNet - AstraGene Life Sciences spectrophotometer.

2010:

- Gold - Affinity Biosensors - Archimedes particle sizing instrument;
- Silver - Ametek - Spectro MS simultaneous inductively-coupled plasma mass spectrometer;
- Bronze – MSI Tokyo - InfiTOF compact time-of-flight mass spectrometer.

2009:

- Gold - InXitu - Terra portable XRF/XRD system;
- Silver - Picarro Inc/OI Analytical - iTOC-CRDS Isotopic Carbon Analyzer;
- Bronze – Shimadzu Corp - IG-1000 Single Nano Particle Size Analyzer.

2008:

- Gold – Bruker Corp - SMART X2S automated X-ray diffractometer;
- Silver - Nlisis BV - Meltfit One capillary column connector;
- Bronze - Bruker Corp - Portable S2 PICOFOX total reflection X-ray fluorescence spectrometer.

2007:

- Gold - Waters Corp - Synapt high definition mass spectrometer;
- Silver - Paraytec Ltd - ActiPix D100 and Thermo Fisher Scientific Inc - Electron-Transfer Dissociation module for mass spectrometry;
- Bronze - Bruker Optics - Alpha FT-IR spectrometer.

2006:

- Gold - Thermo Electron Corp - Finnigan LTQ Orbitrap hybrid mass spectrometer;
- Silver - Chata Biosystems Inc - Chem+Mix;
- Bronze – Cerno Bioscience – MassWorks.

2005:

- Gold – JEOL Ltd - DART (direct analysis real-time) ionisation technology for mass spectrometry;
- Silver - ESA Biosciences Inc – Corona CAD charged aerosol detector, Dionex Corp - ICS-3000 Reagent-free research-grade ion chromatography system and Shimadzu Corp - LC/MS-IT-TOF;
- Bronze - Agilent Technologies Inc - HPLC-Chip ESI/MS.

2004:

- Gold - Waters Corp - ACQUITY UPLC and Bruker Optics Inc / Teraview Ltd- TPI Spectra 1000;
- Silver - Wyatt Technology Corporation - Optilab rEX;
- Bronze - Axsun Technologies Inc - Miniature NIR-APS analyzers.

2003:

- Gold - Dionex Corp - ICS 2000 Reagent-Free ion chromatography system;
- Silver - Thermo Electron Corp - Finnigan LTQ hybrid ion-trap FTMS;
- Bronze - LECO Corp - ChromaTOF software and Ionalytics - Selectra dynamic ion filter.

2002:

- Gold – Horiba Jobin-Yvon Inc - LabRam IR and Thermo Labsystems - eRecordManager software;
- Silver - Ultrasonic Scientific - HR-US 101;
- Bronze – JEOL Ltd - AccuTOF mass spectrometer.

2001:

- Gold – Merck KGaA - Chromolith monolithic HPLC columns;
- Silver – Siemens AG - Advance Quantra FTICR mass spectrometer
- Bronze - CEM Corp - SMART Trac and Syagen Technology - Radiance Pro quadrupole ion trap TOF MS.

2000:

- Gold – Agilent Technologies Inc - 2100 Bioanalyzer;
- Silver – Beckman Corp / ThermoQuest - P/ACE MDQ capillary electrophoresis-mass spectrometer;
- Bronze – Textron Inc - NIR Grain analyzer.

1999:

- Gold - PerkinElmer SCIEX - ELAN 6100 DRC ICP-MS;
- Silver - Bear Instruments Inc - Kodiak 1200 benchtop MS-MS;
- Bronze – ThermoQuest Corp - Finnigan LCQ Deca ion trap MS.

1998:

- Gold - TA Instruments Inc / Topometrix Corp - micro-TA;
- Silver - Dionex Corp - EG40 eluent generator;
- Bronze - Thermedics Detection Inc - EZ Flash GC retrofit/upgrade system.

1997:

- Gold – Micromass Ltd - Platform ICP-MS;
- Silver - Hewlett-Packard Co - Genearray optical reader;
- Bronze - PerSeptive Biosystems Inc - Mariner LC-MS.

1996:

- Gold – Thermedics Inc - Flash 2D GC;
- Silver - Hewlett-Packard Co - Series 1100 HPLC;
- Bronze - Varian Inc - Saturn 2000 GC-MS.
