= JEOL =

Japanese manufacturer of scientific instruments

JEOL Ltd.
- Native name: 日本電子株式会社
- Type: Public KK
- Traded as: TYO: 6951
- ISIN: JP3735000006
- Industry: Precision instrument
- Founded: May 30, 1949; 77 years ago
- Founders: Kenji Kazato; Kazuo Ito
- Headquarters: Akishima, Tokyo 196-8558, Japan
- Area served: Worldwide
- Key people: Gon-emon Kurihara (President)
- Products: Scientific and metrology instruments; Semiconductor equipment; Clinical chemistry analyzers
- Revenue: ▲JPY 107.3 billion (FY 2015) (US$ 952 million) (FY 2015)
- Net income: ▲JPY 4 billion (FY 2015) (US$ 36.2 million) (FY 2015)
- Number of employees: 2,963 (consolidated as of March 31, 2016)
- Website: www.jeol.co.jp/en/

JEOL, Ltd. (日本電子, Nihon Denshi Kabushiki-kaisha; Nihon meaning Japan and Denshi meaning electron) is a major developer and manufacturer of electron microscopes and other scientific instruments, industrial equipment and medical equipment.

Its headquarters are in Tokyo, Japan, with 25 domestic and foreign subsidiaries and associated companies as of 2014. It is listed in the top ten businesses worldwide for analytical laboratory instrument manufacturing.

It has been included in the Activest Lux Nanotech Mutual Fund and the WestLB Nanotech Fund.

== History ==
Scientists in Japan began to collaborate as early as 1939 on the development of an electron microscope. Kenji Kazato and Kazuo Ito met while working at the Naval Central Institute in Tokyo during World War II. After the war, Kazato attracted Ito and a group of others to Mobara, Chiba Prefecture, Japan. This initial group developed a prototype magnetic field–type electron microscope called the DA-1, which was sold to Mitsubishi in 1947. Because of differences over the direction of this early company, Kazato and Ito chose to found a new organization.

The Japan Electron Optics Laboratory Company, Limited (Nihon Denshi Kogaku Kenkyujo) was founded in 1949 by Kenji Kazato and Kazuo Ito in Mitaka, Tokyo. It produced its first commercial model transmission electron microscope, the JEM-1, a year later. Overseas sales began in 1956 with the sale of a system to France. The company's strengths were the customization of orders to fit customer requests, and the provision of strong customer support.

In 1961, the company was renamed JEOL, Limited. Its first overseas subsidiary, JEOL Company (USA) Inc., was established in 1962 and headquartered in Peabody, MA. JEOL was listed on the Second Section of the Tokyo Stock Exchange by 1962, and on the First Section of the Tokyo Stock Exchange by 1966.

The company expanded from electron microscopy to nuclear magnetic resonance (NMR), releasing the first NMR system in Japan, the JNM-1, in 1956. They produced their first mass spectrometer in 1963, and their first scanning electron microscope in 1966. In 1968, they produced the first amino acid analyzer in the world, the JLC-5AH. The company also continued to develop its line of electron microscopes. The JEM-7, in 1964, was the first electronic microscope to include a mechanism for the electrical adjustment of the lens axis. The JEM-100B incorporated an electromagnetic deflection unit as well as an electromagnetic stigmator. The first photomicrograph of atomic arrangement in the world was taken by a JEOL electron microscope, in 1976.

Kazuo Ito has expressed the company's philosophy as follows:

"On the basis of creativity, and research and development, JEOL (日本電子) positively challenges the world’s highest technology thus forever contributing to the progress in both science and human society through its products."

In commemoration of JEOL's 20th anniversary, the Kazato Research Foundation was created to support electron microscopy research. Kenji Kazato retired as president of JEOL in 1975, but continued to act as an adviser to the company until his death in 2012. Kazuo Ito was JEOL's president from 1982 to 1987. The Pittcon Heritage Award was posthumously awarded to them in 2016 for their contributions to scientific instrumentation. In 2014, a STEM resolution of 45 pm with a 300 kV microscope was first demonstrated with the atomic transmission electron microscope JEM-ARM300F.

== Operations ==
JEOL Ltd. has four business segments. Electron Optics manufactures scanning electron microscopes, transmission electron microscopes and scanning probe microscopes, along with related equipment. The Analytical Instruments section's products include mass spectrometers, nuclear magnetic resonance and electron spin resonance equipment. The Industrial Equipment segment covers a range of equipment particularly targeted at the semiconductor industry, such as electron beam sources, wafer process monitors, and plasma gun series. Finally, the Medical Equipment segment manufactures automatic analysis devices, clinical diagnostic systems and amino acid analyzers.

== Products ==
- The JEOL AccuTOF JMS T100LC mass spectrometer won a bronze award at the 2002 Pittsburgh Conference on Analytical Chemistry and Applied Spectroscopy
- The DART ion source won a Pittcon Editors' Gold Award at the 2005 Pittsburgh Conference on Analytical Chemistry and Applied Spectroscopy
- maskless lithograph ML2 type, JBX-8100FS, based on patented ZrO/W (Schottky) emitter.

== In popular culture ==
The company's direct analysis in real time (DART) mass spectrometry system has appeared on the television program CSI: NY.

The JEOL transmission electron microscope JEM 1011 was a base platform for Prometheus (2012 film) science lab microscope.

== See also ==
- Laboratory equipment
