= A. Blaine Bowman =

American physicist (born 1946)

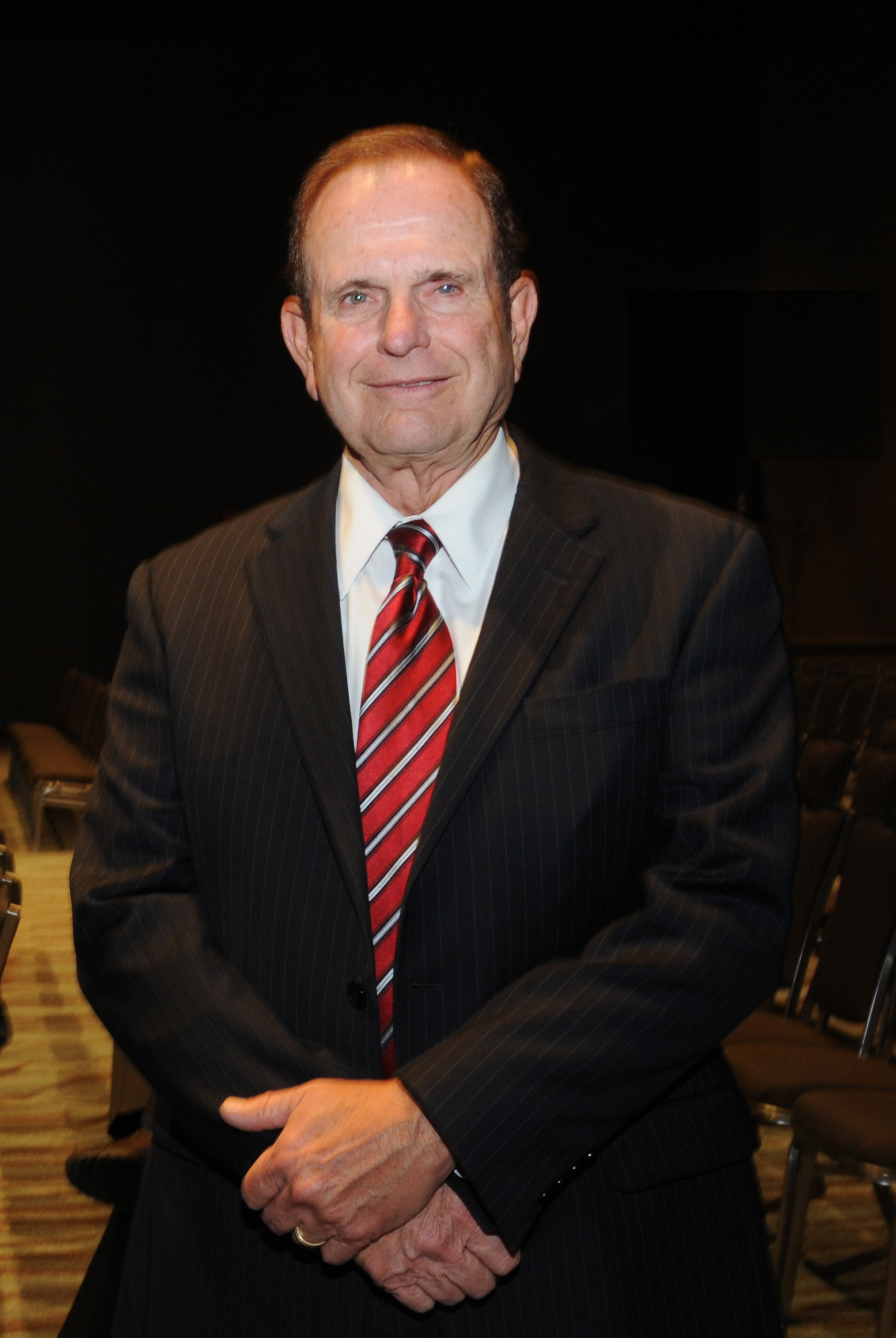
- Pittcon Heritage Award recipient, 2015
- Born: 1946 (age 79–80); Ogden, Utah, USA
- Education: Brigham Young University, Stanford University
- Scientific career
- Fields: Ion chromatography
- Workplaces: Dionex Corporation

Arthur 'Blaine' Bowman (born 1946 in Ogden, Utah, USA) is a leading proponent of ion chromatography, who has served variously as chairman, president, chief executive officer, and director of Dionex Corporation, a manufacturer of analytical instruments. Bowman received the 2015 Pittcon Heritage Award in recognition of his contributions to the field of ion chromatography.

== Early life and education ==
Arthur 'Blaine' Bowman was born in 1946 in Ogden, Utah, US. Around age 10, his family moved to Southern California, where he grew up. Bowman attended Brigham Young University in Provo, Utah in the physics program. As an undergraduate, he worked in the summer as an engineer at McDonnell Douglas, testing modules for the Apollo rocket. Bowman received his B.S. in physics in 1970.

Next, Bowman worked as a product engineer at Motorola's Semiconductor Products Division in Phoenix, Arizona, where he became interested in business. He attended Stanford University's school of business from 1971 to 1973, receiving his M.B.A. in 1973. He then joined McKinsey & Company as a management consultant.

== Career ==
In 1977, Bowman joined International Plasma Corporation of Hayward, California as chief financial officer and general manager of its analytical instrument division. International Plasma Corporation owned Durrum Instrument Corporation, an instrumentation company that had purchased exclusive rights to an emergent technology, Ion chromatography, from Dow Chemical Company. Initial research by Hamish Small and others at the Dow Physical Research Laboratory in Midland, Michigan suggested that inorganic ion analysis would be superior to commonly used wet chemical techniques, but Dow was not interested in pursuing the idea.

Bowman became interested in the potential of ion chromatography (IC) while at International Plasma Corporation. In 1980, Smith-Kline acquired International Plasma Corporation. The IC division was spun off as a separate company, under the name Dionex Corporation, in a leveraged buyout (LBO) led by A. Blaine Bowman. Bowman became the president and CEO of the new company, which was incorporated in California in 1980. The company was reincorporated in Delaware in 1986. Dionex began to trade publicly as of 1982.

Under Bowman's leadership, Dionex made important advances both scientifically and economically. The company directed up to nine percent of its revenues back into its ongoing research and development program. This enabled them to make a number of major technological improvements, including the introduction of fiber suppressors (1981), a metal-free system eliminating sources of contamination and corrosion (1981), integrated workstation and process analysis capabilities (1984), suppressors for gradient elution (1986) and accelerated solvent extraction (1995). These technological changes made it possible for scientists to detect ionic materials quickly at extremely low levels of concentration. This increased both the sensitivity of the tests that it was possible to do and the productivity of the people doing them. Bowman recognized the importance of developing software and data handling capabilities in support of Dionex's hardware. Bowman has also emphasized the importance of marketing support, working closely with customers to ensure that they were satisfied with the products they were using, and developing new applications for customers' areas of interest. He has stated that, in his opinion, what distinguished Dionex was that "we do provide a complete solutions approach for our customers. We don't just sell them hardware and walk away. We work with them to make sure that what we sell them makes them more effective and productive in their job."

Through such improvements, Dionex was able to support much faster extraction of organic compounds for analysis from chemical mixtures, including complicated samples such as soils, polymers, and processed foods. The technology has wide application, in environmental testing laboratories, life science and food companies, chemical/petrochemical firms, power generation facilities, electronics manufacturers, government agencies, and academic institutions. For example, during semiconductor production, Dionex instruments are used to detect and prevent ionic contamination, which can cause degradation of semiconductor surfaces and deterioration of their electrical properties. The Environmental Protection Agency has approved instruments such as the Dionex AS4 column for the analysis of anions in drinking water. Dionex columns are used by municipalities seeking to ensure the safety of drinking water and by companies selling bottled waters.

The company made a point of developing worldwide distribution channels: as of 2007 Dionex's sales were distributed relatively evenly between North America, Europe, and the Asia/Pacific area. In the area of ion chromatography (IC), Dionex controlled more than 70 percent of a $200 million worldwide market. In the newer area of high-performance liquid chromatography (HPLC), which Dionex entered in 1998, the company held a much smaller place (1%) in a much larger market ($2 billion market).

Bowman directed the company from its early stages of development, as a small branch of a larger company with approximately $1 million in revenues in a year, to its position as publicly traded enterprise with an established international revenue stream in the hundreds of millions of dollars. Bowman retired as president and chief executive officer of Dionex in 2002. Net sales for fiscal 2002 were $182 million in spite of a shaky economic climate. Bowman retired as chairman of the board in 2005, but continued to serve on the board of directors. Net sales for fiscal 2005 were $279.3 million, and by 2007 had reached $327.3 million.

In 2010, Dionex was acquired by Thermo Fisher Scientific for $2.1 billion.

== Boards of Directors ==
Bowman has served on the boards of directors of a number of companies in the areas of innovative technologies and the life sciences in addition to Dionex. From 1985 to 2007, Bowman served as a director of Molecular Devices Corporation, a supplier of bioanalytical measurement instruments. In 2006, he was appointed lead director of the board of Cell BioSciences, a privately held company engaged in protein research in the emerging area of nanoproteomics. He was appointed to the board of Solexa, Inc. in 2006. Solexa, which developed genome sequencing technology, was acquired in 2007 by Illumina, Inc., on whose board of directors Bowman now serves. Illumina develops tools for DNA, RNA, and protein analysis. A. Blaine Bowman joined Altera Corporation's board of directors as of July 30, 2012. Altera develops programmable logic devices.

== Awards ==
Bowman was awarded the Pittcon Heritage Award in 2015, recognizing him for "providing the dedication, leadership and vision to commercialize ion chromatography and foster its evolution to a technology of critical importance for academic and a broad range of industries."
