= Viatcheslav Artaev =

Russian-American physicist

Viatcheslav Artae
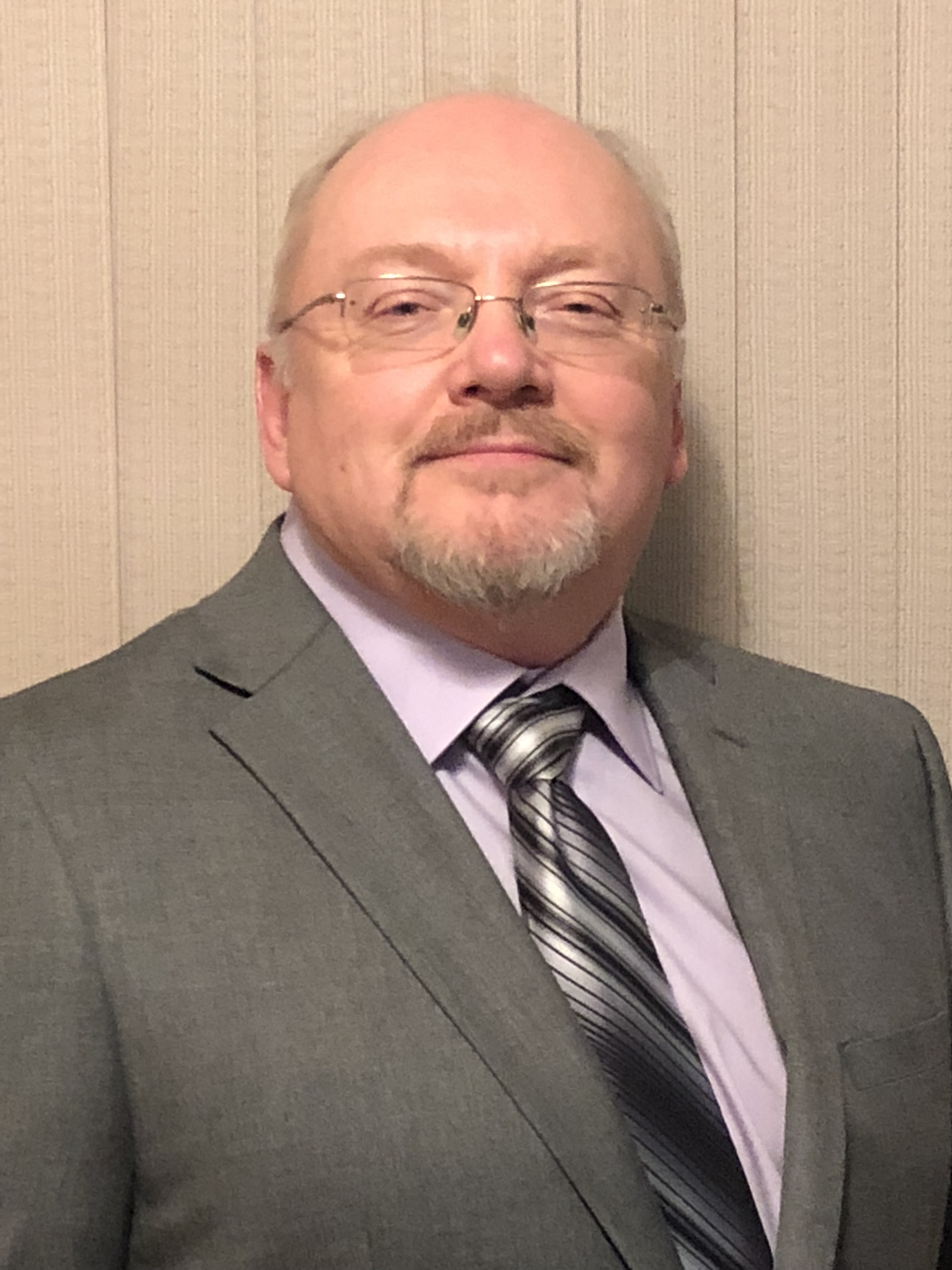
- Born: Viatcheslav Borisovich Artae; January 24, 1960
- Education: Moscow Engineering Physics Institute
- Scientific career
- Fields: Physics

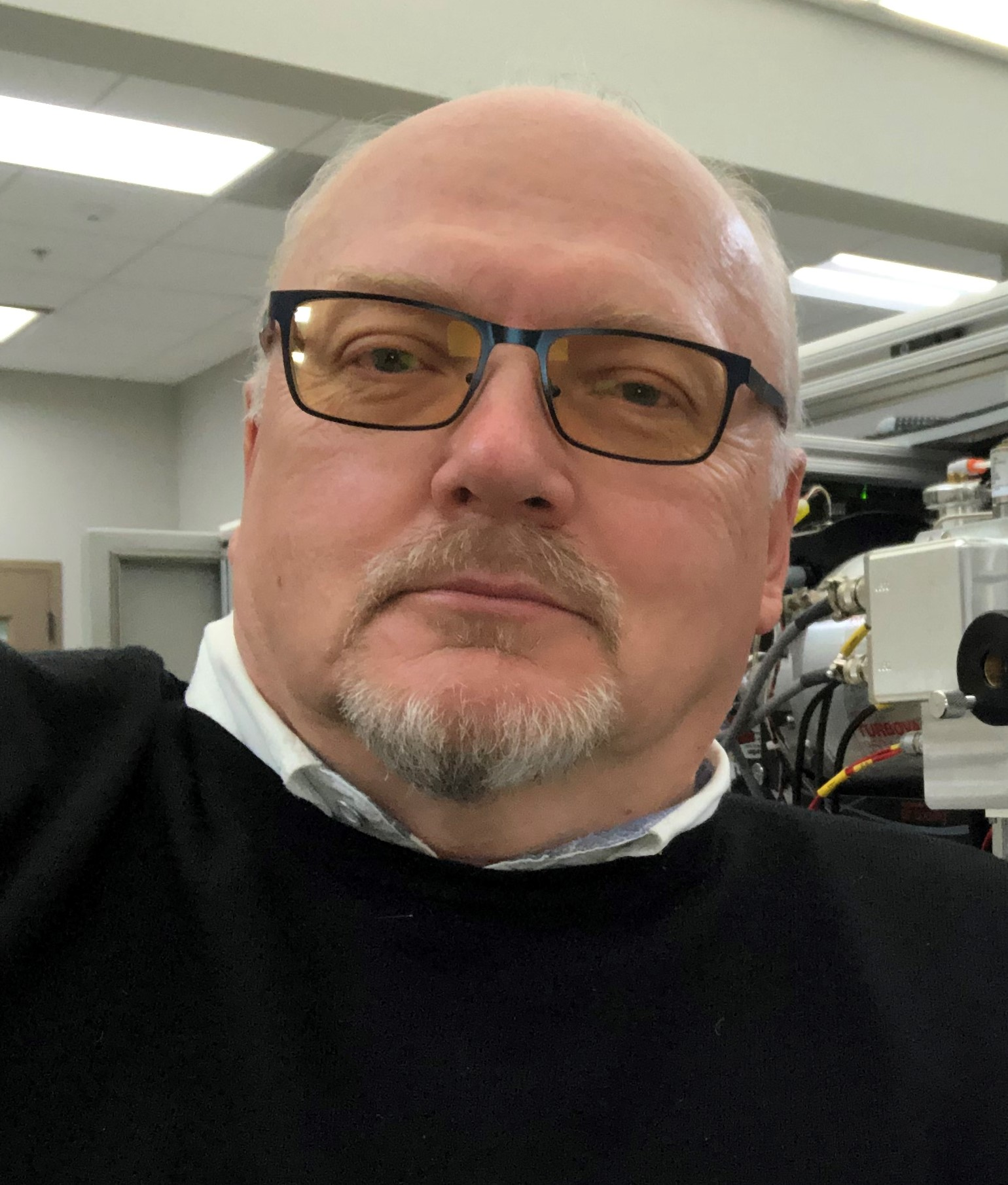

Viatcheslav ("Slava") Borisovich Artaev (born January 24, 1960) is a Russian-American physicist who studies Mass Spectrometry technology. He currently works as the technical director for research and development of the separation science division for LECO Corporation based in Saint Joseph, Michigan, USA.:

== Education ==
Artaev is a graduate of the Molecular Physics program at the Moscow Engineering Physics Institute (MEPhI).

== Career ==
=== Arrival in the United States and Meridian ===
Following the fall of the Soviet Union, Artaev sought to find work outside of the newly formed Russia due to concerns about political instability and the desire to build a better life for his family. Ultimately, he was offered a temporary position in Okemos, Michigan working for Meridian Instruments, a research and development group formed from Michigan State University graduates and professors. In 1993, Meridian offered Artaev a full-time position, and Artaev and his family immigrated to the United States. At Meridian Instruments, Artaev worked alongside computer programmer Kevin McNitt to develop the GC-TOFMS (Gas Chromatography Time-of-Flight Mass Spectrometer), which could analyze a 60 compound VOC mixture in under 80 seconds, compared to the one hour for similar instruments available at the time.

=== LECO Corporation ===
In 1995, LECO Corporation, which is based in Saint Joseph, Michigan, acquired Artaev's project from Meridian Instruments and added Artaev and McNitt to their research and development team. LECO heavily invested in continuing what Artaev and McNitt had developed at Meridian and eventually created the world's first commercial GC-TOFMS, known as the Pegasus, in 1997. The instrument was capable of recording in excess of 500 full spectra per second without data loss, something that many Mass Spectrometer manufacturers still struggle to accomplish to this day.

Artaev put LECO on the forefront of cutting-edge technology in the Mass Spectrometry world. Artaev continued to set scientific milestones by improving his Pegasus instrument to increase the speed and accuracy by which the instruments would produce data. The instruments produced by LECO under Artaev's direction are

- 2002 Pegasus 4D – World's first GC×GC-TOFMS
- 2011 Pegasus GC-HRT – Accurate mass GC-TOFMS
- 2015 Pegasus GC-HRT 4D – World's first fast GC×GC accurate mass GC-TOFMS with up to 40m flight path
- 2016 Pegasus BT – Previous knowledge shrunk down to a bench-top, sensitivity and mass accuracy improved by orders of magnitude
- 2017 Pegasus GC-HRT^{+} 4D – World's first full mass range fast accurate mass GC×GC-TOFMS
- 2018 Pegasus BT 4D – World's first GC×GC TOFMS with quantitation spec as standard

In addition, Artaev is a founding member and former president of the Russian Mass Spectrometry Interest Group at ASMS, which emerged in 1998 at the annual ASMS meeting in Orlando, Florida. The group was created to help assimilate mass spectrometrists from the former Soviet Union who were working the West. It has developed into a social and scientific club that now includes over 200 members. The interest group is notable not only for its work to assimilate scientists, but also for its impromptu musical performances around the hotel piano, as well as water polo matches in the hotel pools.

== Publications ==
Artaev has been the co-author of a number of publications based on studies conducted with his Mass Spectrometer products developed at LECO. Some of those recent publications include:

- A New Path to High-Resolution HPLC―TOF-MS — Survey, Targeted, and Trace Analysis Applications of TOF-MS in the Analysis of Complex Biochemical Matrices (2011)
- The benefits of high resolution mass spectrometry in environmental analysis (2013)
- Determination of polycyclic aromatic hydrocarbons in water by gas chromatography/mass spectrometry with accelerated sample preparation (2014)
- Rapid liquid–liquid extraction for the reliable GC/MS analysis of volatile priority pollutants (2015)
- Primordial soup was edible: abiotically produced Miller-Urey mixture supports bacterial growth (2015)
- Novel pollutants in the Moscow atmosphere in winter period: Gas chromatography-high resolution time-of-flight mass spectrometry study (2017)
- Stability and removal of selected avobenzone's chlorination products (2017)
- Detection of semi-volatile compounds in cloud waters by GC×GC-TOF-MS. Evidence of phenols and phthalates as priority pollutants (2018)
- Semi volatile organic compounds in the snow of Russian Arctic islands: Archipelago Novaya Zemlya (2018)

== Personal life ==
Viatcheslav has been married to Sabina Artaeva since 1984. Together they have two sons, both of whom are practicing attorneys in Michigan. In his spare time, Artaev enjoys travel to tropical destinations like Mexico, and playing tennis and pickleball.
