= Paraytec =

- Company type: Private company
- Industry: scientific instruments
- Founded: 2005; 20 years ago
- Founder: University of York
- Headquarters: York, United Kingdom
- Area served: Worldwide
- Key people: David Goodall (Chief Scientific Officer), Viv Hallam (Executive Director)
- Products: Fluid flow and particle detectors, optical particle analysis instruments
- Owner: Braveheart Investment Group
- Number of employees: 4 (2024)
- Website: www.paraytec.com

Paraytec (Parallel Array Technology) is a British scientific instrument company that designs and manufactures ultraviolet imaging detectors, (based on CMOS chips) used mainly in scientific research.

== History ==
Paraytec was founded in 2005 as a spin-out from the University of York with chemist David Goodall as Chief Scientific Officer.

In July 2011 Paraytec entered into a development and technology licensing agreement with Malvern Instruments.

== Recognition ==
- R&D 100 Award (2007)
- UK Trade and Investment (UKTI) Export Award (2007)
- Pittcon Editors' Awards Silver (2007)
