= Gail Brion =

American civil engineer

- Born: Gail Montgomery Brion
- Education: California University of Pennsylvania (BS, 1978); University of Colorado Boulder (MS, 1985; PhD, 1995)
- Known for: Waterborne disease control, environmental research and training
- Title: Emeritus Professor
- Awards: University of Kentucky Chellgren Professor (2015–2018); Raymond-Blythe Professor (2005–2011)
- Scientific career
- Fields: Civil engineering, Environmental engineering, Public health
- Workplaces: University of Kentucky; U.S. EPA

Gail Montgomery Brion is an inventor and a professor of civil engineering and the Director of the Environmental Research and Training Laboratories (ERTL) at the University of Kentucky. An expert on waterborn illness, she holds a co-appointment in the College of Public Health. She works to introduce and maintain high quality water systems in rural regions. In September 2021, the University of Kentucky University Senate named Gail Brion the 2021 Outstanding Senator.

== Career ==
Brion first followed her interests to Duncan, Lagnese, and Associates Incorporated, an industrial waste company, where she acted as the Sewer Studies Field Team Supervisor. From 1979 to 1980, Brion worked as the Sewage Treatment Plant Operator for the Brush Run Municipal in Mckeesport, PA where she analyzed water and waste water. The following year, she moved to another Municipal Sewage Treatment Plant in Rock Springs, Wyoming where she took over as the Chief Lab Analyst. From 1981 to 1982 Brion worked as a Product Specialist for the Hach Company, assisting in chemical analysis and customer troubleshooting. Starting in March 1982, she began as the Plant Chemist for the Fort St. Vrain Generating Station, analyzing the cooling, waste, and natural water systems. 1984 marked the start of her 6-year employment for the United States Environmental Protection Agency, working under 3 different divisions over that time span. While in the Water Quality Division Brion worked as a Co-op Student Engineer. In the Air and Toxics Division she held the title of NESHAPS Asbestos Coordinator and finally in the Office of Air Quality Rulings and Standards as an Environmental Engineer.

External audio
- “Mtn. Talk Monday: Gail Brion Ph.D - Problems with Water Systems Infrastructure in Eastern Kentucky”, October 11, 2016, WMMT
- Gail Brion interviewed for UK at the Half, College of Engineering

Brion worked for the Environmental Protection Agency before she began teaching engineering at the University of Kentucky in 1995.

She now connects research and work between the University of Kentucky's Environmental Engineering program and the College of Public Health to accomplish mutual goals that benefit public health through engineering.

We can treat extraordinarily dirty water, ... But even if the water treatment plant does a good job of producing clean, quality water, it then goes into a distribution system that is full of holes.

— Gail Brion, 2018

She is concerned that the lack of ongoing support for water infrastructure in marginalized areas is resulting in ongoing deterioration that will continue until "something large and catastrophic happens".

== Education ==
In 1978, Brion received her Bachelor of Science degree in Environmental Engineering from the University of California. Continuing her educational journey, Brion then completed both her masters of science and PhD in Civil Engineering at the University of Colorado at Boulder in 1985 and 1995 respectively.

== Advocacy ==
Brion's interest in waterborn illness began in childhood, inspired by personal experiences with water contamination. Some of her friends became ill after wading in a city park creek. After investigating, she found an unregulated straight pipe dumping untreated hospital wastes into the water. She also saw a migrant family, whose children were too sick to work at a berry field, drinking untreated irrigation water because no other water sources were available. She commented, "a desire to make a difference was kindled."

== Awards and honors ==
Year	Award or Honor	Awarding Body	Notes
2021	University of Kentucky Outstanding Senator	UK University Senate	Recognition for 11 years of leadership in faculty governance.
2016	College of Engineering Service Award	UK Stanley and Karen Pigman College of Engineering	Awarded for distinguished service to the college and students.
2015–2018	Chellgren Professor	Chellgren Center for Undergraduate Excellence	For excellence in undergraduate research and teaching.
2005–2011	Raymond-Blythe Professor	UK Department of Civil Engineering	Named endowed professorship.
2000	Outstanding Teacher Award	UK College of Engineering	Selected by students and peers for excellence in the classroom.
1999	NSF CAREER Award	National Science Foundation	(Nominee/Recipient) for research in environmental microbiology.
