= Michael Morris (oceanographer) =

American biochemist and oceanographer

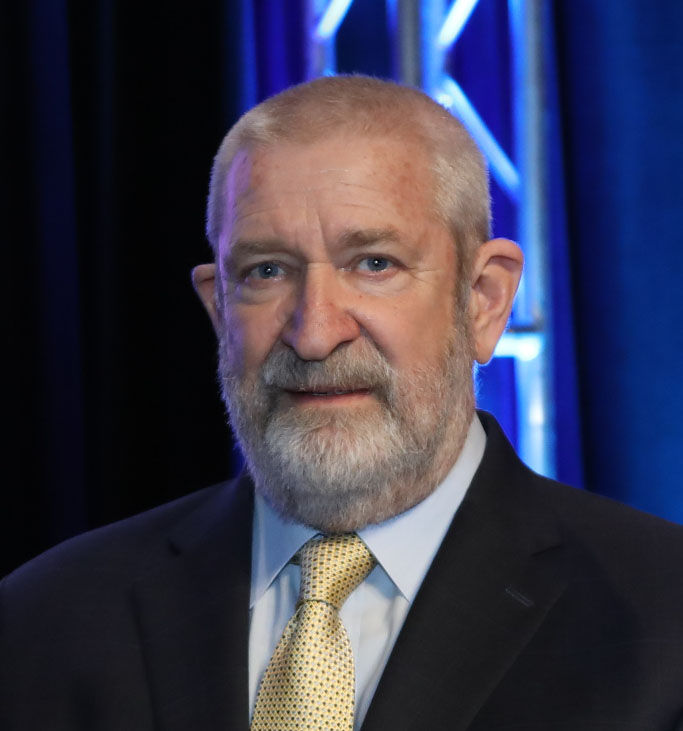
- Spouse: Linda Morris
- Awards: Pittcon Heritage Award

Michael Morris is an American biochemist, oceanographer and businessman, who has designed, developed and marketed new applications of optical sensing technology and spectroscopy. He has founded several companies including pHish Doctor (pH sensors for home aquariums), Ocean Optics Inc. (OOI) (miniature spectrometers), and SpectrEcology (engineering and support services for optical sensing applications).

Morris is credited with developing the first miniature spectrometer. The miniature spectrometers introduced by Morris' Ocean Optics have wide applications in the food industry, pharmaceuticals, agriculture, aquaculture, the environment, medicine, dentistry, and forensics. They have been used on the Mir Space Station, the Space Shuttle, and the Mars rover Curiosity. They have been used to discover new information about the structure and properties of the Hope Diamond and other blue diamonds.

== Education ==
Morris has a B.Sc. in Chemical and Cell Biology from Rutgers University and an M.Sc. in Marine Science from the University of South Florida.

== Career ==
Morris gained experience as a sales representative for Fisher Scientific. He also served as the associate director of technology transfer for the Southern Technology Applications Center for technology entrepreneurs, sponsored by NASA.

His first entrepreneurial venture, in 1986, was pHish Doctor. He borrowed $10,000 to create the company, which sold pH sensors for home aquariums. That project was successful enough to help him start his next company.

Morris worked with Robert Byrne, Luis Garcia-Rubio, and Roy Walters from the University of Central Florida, on the development of a fiber-optic pH sensor for use in seawater. In 1989, they co-founded Ocean Optics, Inc. with the help of a Small Business Innovation Research (SBIR) grant from the U.S. Department of Energy. A miniature spectrometer that they had developed as part of the fiber-optic project became the company's core product.

They introduced the first miniature fiber-optic spectrometer, the S1000, in 1992. It was capable of measuring wavelengths in the visible range. The company focused its mission around being agile, understanding customers' desires and creating applications to meet customer demand, "enabling any measurement involving absorbance, transmission, reflection, or emission of light." The company was bought by Halma in 2004.

After the sale of Ocean Optics Morris went on to found SpectrEcology, which specializes in engineering and support services for applications that use optical sensing.

== Applications ==
=== NASA projects ===
Ocean Optics' miniature spectrometers have been used on the Mir Space Station, the Space Shuttle, and the Mars rover Curiosity. In 2009, an Ocean Optics QE65000 Spectrometer named "ALICE" was modified by Aurora Design & Technology for use in NASA's Lunar CRater Observation and Sensing Satellite (LCROSS) mission. ALICE measured ultraviolet light resulting from the impact of the Centaur upper rocket stage on the floor of the crater Cabeus. This confirmed that water ice is present on the moon.

The Rocky 7 Rover prototype used an Ocean Optics point spectrometer which was sensitive in the range of 350-800 nm.

Three Ocean Optics HR2000 spectrometers were customized as part of the ChemCam unit of the NASA Mars Science Laboratory rover, Curiosity, which was launched November 26, 2011. The spectrometers were configured to measure different wavelengths of light, in the ranges of 240-336 nm, 380-470 nm, and 470-850 nm. The Laser Induced Breakdown Spectrometer (LIBS) used a laser to fire a series of very short pulses at a nearby target. The initial shots cleared away any dust, while the later ones heated the rock to create a flash of ionized gas or plasm. The resulting light was measured by the spectrometers and the spectra were analyzed to determine the composition of Martian rock and soil. Since landing, the ChemCam has identified hundreds of thousands of samples, including calcium, gypsum and bassanite.

The incorporation of an instrument for Raman spectroscopy is being planned by NASA's Mars 2020 Rover Science Definition Team.

=== Blue diamonds ===
Ocean Optics' portable spectrometers have been also been used to examine the phosphorescence spectrum of the Hope Diamond, the Blue Heart Diamond and other natural type IIb blue diamonds. The Smithsonian, the United States Naval Research Laboratory, Ocean Optics Co. and Pennsylvania State University collaborated on a study to examine hundreds of blue diamonds. Researchers examined the spectral and temporal properties of the diamonds using a USB2000-FL spectrometer for UV/Vis light studies and an IR512 spectrometer for Raman spectroscopy.

The Hope Diamond, in the collection of the Smithsonian National Museum of Natural History, shows a distinctive red phosphorescent glow when exposed to ultraviolet light. Visible to the human eye, it had never been explained. The researchers discovered that all blue diamonds show red and green peaks in their phosphorescence spectrum, due to the presence of nitrogen and boron in the stones. The intensity and rate of decay of the spectrum varies from diamond to diamond. This technique may enable individual blue diamonds to be "fingerprinted" for identification purposes.

=== Other applications ===
Ocean Optics' miniature spectrometers are used in hospitals, in airport security and in university and high school chemistry labs. They have applications in the food industry, pharmaceuticals, agriculture, aquaculture, the environment, medicine, dentistry, and forensics. Their small size means that they can be incorporated into scientific instruments that are used outside laboratories, in industrial production settings, on agricultural fields, for environmental monitoring, and for point of care medical use.

== Awards ==
- 2018, Pittcon Heritage Award, Pittcon and Science History Institute

== Philanthropy ==
Morris has contributed to the Endowed Fellowship Awards program at the College of Marine Science of the University of South Florida, St. Petersburg, Florida. He is also a supporter of the St. Petersburg Downtown Partnership's Technology Fund which helps to provide capital for young start-ups in the St. Petersburg area.
