= Accelerated solvent extraction =

Chemical analysis method

- Acronym: ASE
- Manufacturers: Thermo Fisher Scientific

Other techniques
- Related: Solid phase extraction

Accelerated solvent extraction (ASE), also known as pressurized solvent extraction (PSE), is a method for extracting various chemicals from a complex solid or semisolid sample matrix. The process uses high temperature and pressure, which results in the extraction taking less time and requiring less solvent, and possibly also giving better analyte recovery, than traditional methods that use less extreme conditions. The elevated temperature is employed to increase extraction efficiency of the analyte of interest and the elevated pressure is used to keep the solvent in a liquid state as the temperature is increased above its boiling point. An automated system for the process was developed by Dionex, a company owned by Thermo Fisher Scientific.

== Method ==
The extraction cell is filled with the solid sample to be examined and placed in a temperature-controllable oven. After adding the solvent, the cell is heated at constant pressure (adjustable between 0.3 and 20 MPa) up to a maximum temperature of 200°C and kept at constant conditions for a while so that equilibrium can be established. The extract is then transferred to a sample tube. A sample often goes through several extraction cycles. Finally, the extraction cell is rinsed with solvent, the rinsing valve is opened and the cell and all lines are rinsed with nitrogen and the apparatus is prepared for further extractions.

== Applications ==
Accelerated solvent extraction has found many applications in the food industry, including in:

- The testing of dietary seafoods for arsenic content
- Extraction of catechins from green tea samples
- Authentication of natural vanilla flavors
- The analysis of terpenoids and sterols in tobacco

== See also ==
- Supercritical fluid extraction
- Superheated water
