= Kathryn Hach-Darrow =

American businesswoman (1922–2020)

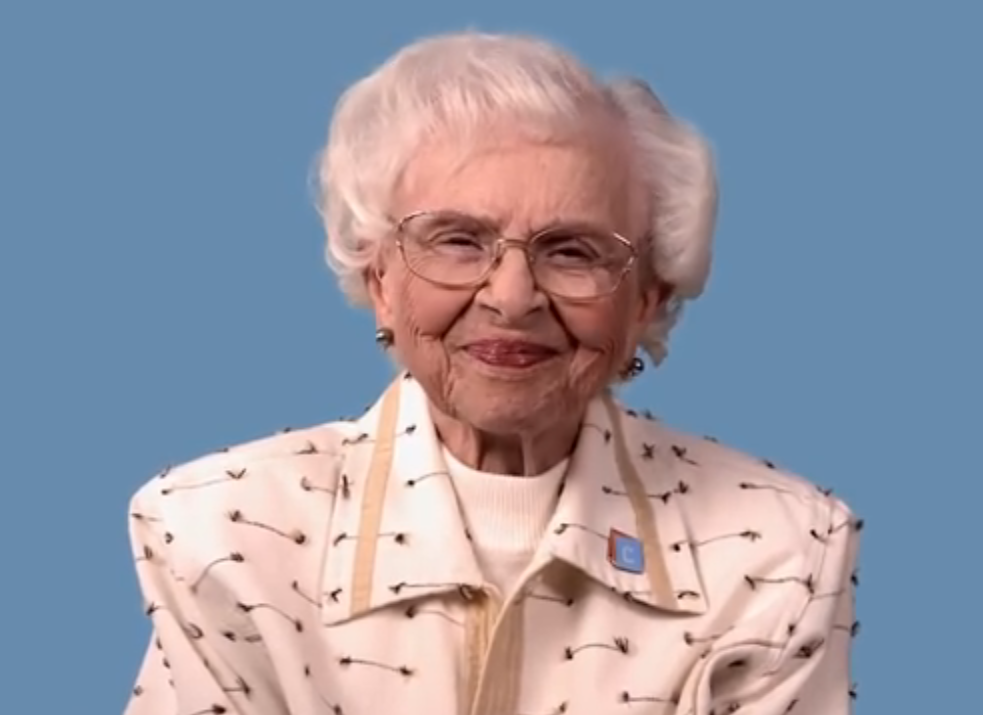
- Born: October 20, 1922; Bucklin, Missouri, U.S.
- Died: June 4, 2020 (aged 97); Loveland, Colorado, U.S.
- Other name: Kitty Hach
- Education: Columbia College; Iowa State University
- Occupations: Businesswoman, philanthropist
- Spouse(s): Clifford C. Hach (m. 1943; died 1990), Donald Darrow (m. 1995)
- Children: 3
- Awards: Pittcon Heritage Award
- Scientific career
- Fields: Business; Chemistry
- Workplaces: Hach Company

Kathryn "Kitty" Hach-Darrow (October 20, 1922 – June 4, 2020) was an American businesswoman and philanthropist who co-founded the Hach Chemical Company in 1947 with her first husband Clifford C. Hach (pronounced hɑ:k). She was essential to the company's expansion, flying her own plane to small airfields across the country to sell water purification kits. She became president, chief operating officer, and CEO of the Hach company.

Kathryn Hach-Darrow was also the first woman director of the American Water Works Association, an international non-profit working for better water quality. She has been noted for philanthropic work as well as her entrepreneurial success, and has received a number of awards and honors as a result of her contributions to both business and chemistry.

== Early life and education ==
Kathryn Carter was born in Bucklin, Missouri, where her father was an automobile dealer. He was also a pilot, flying his own Eagle Rock biplane. Kitty's first ride in an airplane occurred at the age of 5, the beginning of her lifelong love of flying. Her mother was a schoolteacher.

The Great Depression was financially disastrous for the Carter family. Her father did not go bankrupt, but lost his business and his plane. The family bought a farm in Triplett, Missouri and lived there during Kathryn's teens. Kathryn did well in school and earned money for college by raising and selling turkeys. She initially attended Columbia College, Missouri (then named Christian Female College), before transferring to Iowa State University to study home economics.

At Iowa State University, Kitty met Nellie May Naylor, a chemist in the home economics department who interested her in chemistry.

== Marriage and work ==
External videos
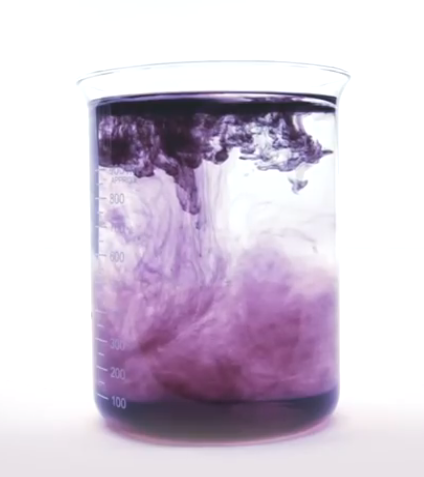
- "The water on this planet is all that we have. It needs to be cared for.", Kathryn Hach-Darrow, Science History Institute

Kathryn and her first husband Clifford C. Hach met as students at Iowa State University, and married in 1943. "I knew right away that this guy was going to build a chemical company," she says. "He didn't care how big Dow was or how big DuPont was, he was going to build his own company."

Clifford did not receive his bachelor's degree until 1947, because he and other students were co-opted to work on war-time projects at the university. It was difficult to find jobs after graduation. Eventually, Clifford was hired part-time by a filtration company in Ames, Iowa to analyze water. Seeing how the water-treatment plant worked gave Clifford the idea for a process and a product: a simplified method of analysis that would enable workers to treat water with powdered formulas rather than heavy chemical solutions.

He raised startup money by selling the rights to another invention. The Walter Kidde fire extinguisher company had approached the University of Iowa for ideas for generating carbon dioxide to fight fires. Clifford came up with a patentable idea, and sold it to the fire company for $15,000. With the money the Hachs co-founded Hach Chemical Company in 1947. They bought an acre of land in Ames, Iowa, and built a cement block building which became their plant. They lived with their three children in a small apartment at the plant.

Clifford Hach was in charge of research and development while Kitty handled management and marketing. Their first successful product was a simplified titration method for measuring hardness in drinking water, which they packaged in easy-to-use testing kits. As municipal standards for drinking water were developed, Kitty recognized both the importance of water plant operators as a market, and the need to work closely with them to develop standards and provide long-term customer service. She developed a direct mail marketing campaign, and earned the nickname "Kitty" Hach by flying her plane across the United States, sometimes landing on rural dirt airstrips in bad weather, delivering water quality testing kits to municipalities of all sizes. She became a member of the Ninety-Nines, an international organization of licensed women pilots, and accumulated over 7,000 hours flying time. She was rated for multi-engine and instrument flying.

Kathryn Hach became the first woman director of the American Water Works Association, an international non-profit, scientific and educational association founded to improve water quality and supply throughout the world. She later served on numerous AWWA committees, including the President's Advisory Council.

== Hach Chemical Company ==
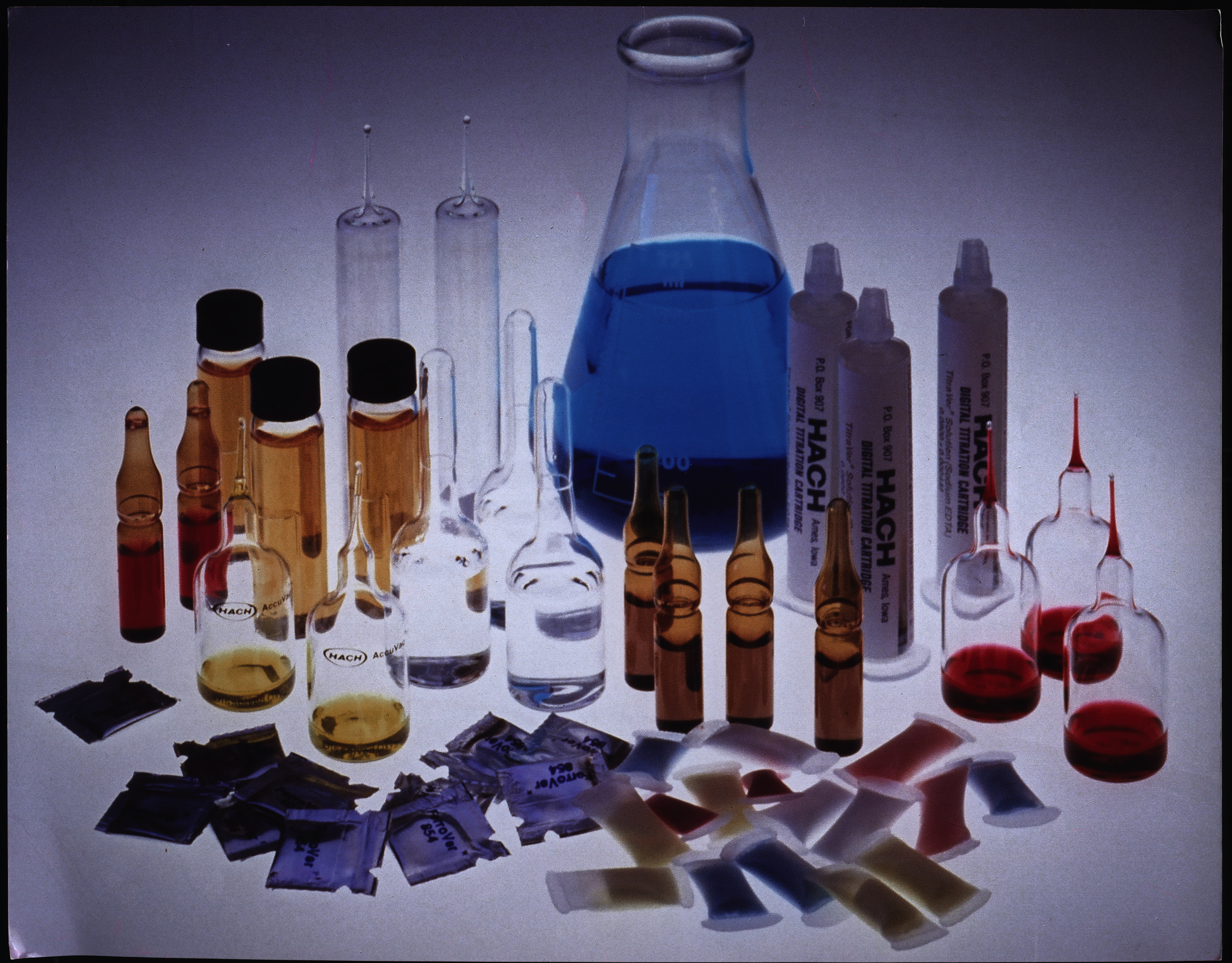
Hach Water Purification Testing

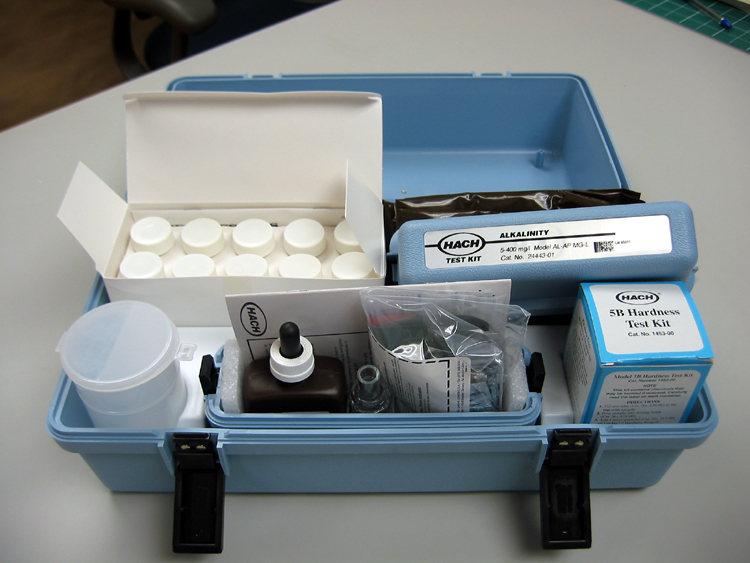
Hach Classroom Drinking Water Testing Kit

Hach Chemical was instrumental in standardizing water-purification tests and pioneered many world-standard analytical instruments. Their tests were designed to be simple and effective, with nontechnical directions that made their products easy for both chemists and non-chemists to use. As of 2012, about 70 percent of municipalities in the United States used Hach Company instrumentation, allowing them to detect impurities in water at the parts-per-billion level.

Hach Chemical Company was incorporated in 1951, went public in 1968. The company moved its headquarters to Loveland, Colorado, in 1978, and was renamed Hach Company in 1980. Under Kitty Hach's management, the company developed an employee base of over 900 people and became one of the top women owned businesses in the United States. Kathryn Hach-Darrow was president, chief operating officer, and CEO of the Hach company.

After Clifford's death in 1990, Kitty was named Hach Co.'s chairman and CEO and her son Bruce assumed the role of president. In 1995, she married Donald Darrow, a retired airline pilot, becoming Kitty Hach-Darrow. In 1999, Kitty and her son Bruce sold the Hach company to Danaher Corporation.

== Awards and honors ==
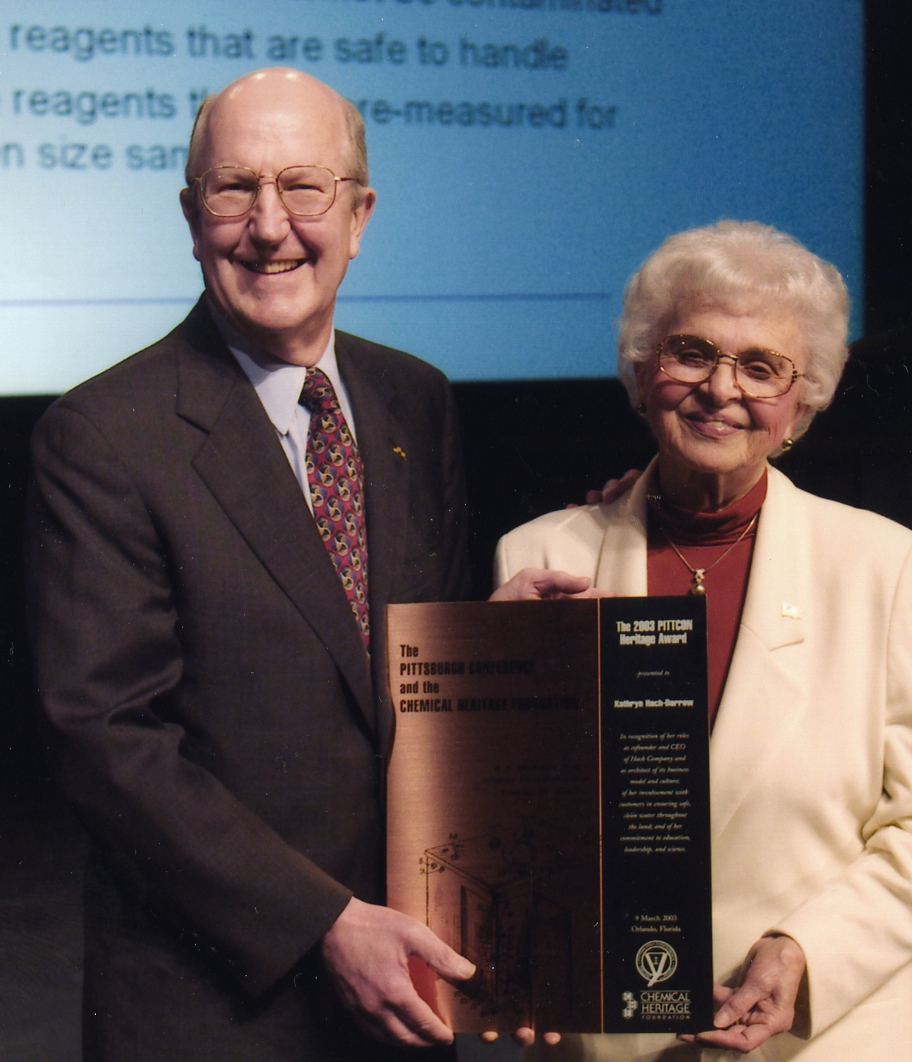
Kitty Hach-Darrow receiving the 2003 Pittcon Heritage Award from Arnold Thackray, head of the Chemical Heritage Foundation

- In 1957, Kathryn and Clifford Hach jointly won the American Water Works George Warren Fuller Award for distinguished service in the water supply field.
- In 1987, the Hach Company was elected the Best Company in Colorado, receiving the award for the Northeastern part of the state.
- In 1992, she was honored by Northwood University with an Outstanding Business Leaders Award.
- In January 2000, she was voted a member of the Colorado Business Hall of Fame (sponsored by the Denver Metro Chamber of Commerce and Junior Achievement).
- Kathryn "Kitty" Hach-Darrow received the second annual Pittcon Heritage Award in 2003.
- In 2004, Kitty Hach-Darrow received the honorary degree of Doctor of Humane Letters from Colorado State University.

== Philanthropy ==
- In 1982 the Hachs established the Hach Scientific Foundation to support chemistry in the classroom through grants to students and schools. In January 2009, the Hach Scientific Foundation transferred its assets to the American Chemical Society, which continues to administer the scholarship and grant programs.
- In May 2000, Kathryn Hach-Darrow gave a $10 million gift to Northwood University. The Hach Student Life Center, a 62,212 square foot student center which includes classrooms, social areas, and sports facilities, opened in 2002.
- Kitty Hach-Darrow and the Hach family were significant contributors to the building of Hach Hall, a new chemistry building dedicated at Iowa State University on October 8, 2010.
- Through gifts in 2012 and 2014, Hach-Darrow established an endowment for the Kathryn C. Hach Award for Entrepreneurial Success through the American Chemical Society. The award is to be given to someone who has "created something where nothing existed before”.
