= Robert J. Warren =

President of LECO Corporation (1933–2022)

Robert James Warren
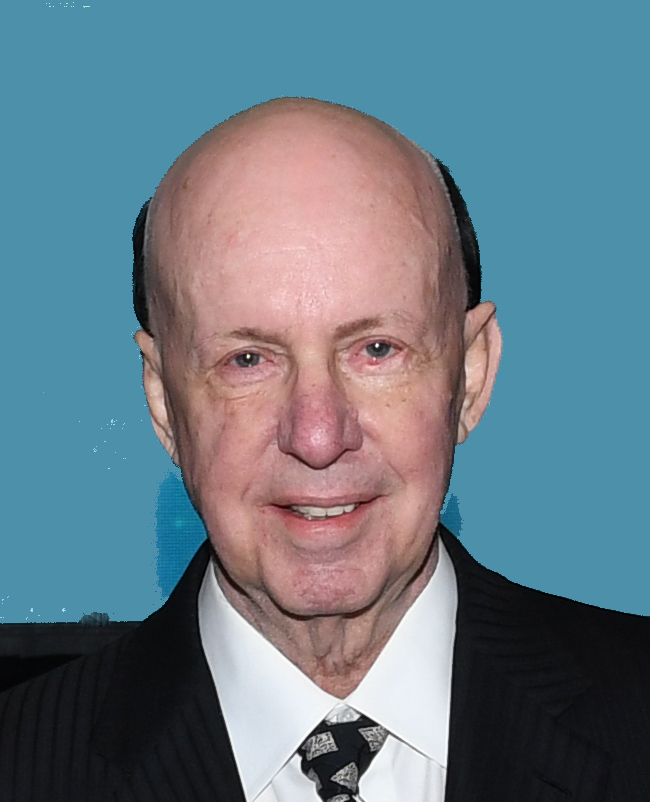
- Warren at Pittcon, 2017
- Born: 1933
- Spouse: Elizabeth S. Warren
- Awards: Pittcon Heritage Award 2017
- Scientific career
- Fields: Scientific instrumentation
- Workplaces: LECO Corporation

Robert J. Warren (1933 – April 23, 2022) was the president emeritus of LECO Corporation, a pioneer in the development of carbon determination instrumentation for use in the iron and steel industry, and other types of analytic instrumentation for use in organic and metallographic analysis and separation science. He was the recipient of the 2017 Pittcon Heritage Award for his contribution to scientific instrumentation.

== Career ==
In 1968, Robert J. Warren joined the family-owned Laboratory Equipment Corporation (LECO). LECO was founded in 1936 by Carl E. Schultz, Charles Schullz, George J. Krasl and Joseph Sauer. Carl E. Schultz's sister was Olga S. Krasl, George Krasl's wife. Robert Warren was also part of the family: his wife Elizabeth was Carl Schultz's daughter.

LECO was already recognized as a leader in materials analysis. The company's first product was a carbon analyzer, a rapid carbon determinator designed to analyze the amount of carbon in steel or iron automatically in minutes. They expanded into die casting, ceramics, glass blowing, plating, and electronics. They developed a wide range of products for laboratory analysis, including induction furnaces for the analysis of carbon and sulphur, metallurgical apparatus for rapid field analysis, and zircon porcelain and glassware for laboratory use.

In 1967, LECO had opened its first international office in Germany. Warren was instrumental in the company's ongoing expansion into Europe and Asia. In 1971, the company received an “E” Award for Exports from President Richard Nixon (authorized on his behalf by Secretary of Commerce Maurice Stans.) The company reported an increase of overseas sales from 17 to 50 percent of its production, over the previous five years. It had expanded its production facilities as a result of the demand. As executive vice president and general manager of the firm, Robert Warren was chosen to receive the award on behalf of LECO. The company attributed its success in part to the establishment of high customer service standards, including careful handling of equipment, selection and training of distributors, and support for staff and customers in their local languages.

In 1976, Warren was named president and general manager of LECO. His wife Elizabeth became vice-president. By 1977, LECO had established international subsidiaries in Brazil, Canada, England, France, West Germany, Sweden and South Africa, in addition to its offices and manufacturing plants in the United States. On June 8, 1977, the Warrens bought the company's outstanding stock from the George J. Krasl Trust, represented by his widow Olga S. Krasl.

Under Warren's direction, LECO's research and development expanded, from manufacturing analytical instruments for metals and inorganics, to add manufacturing analytical instruments for organics. Analysis of organics brought LECO into the coal, oil, agricultural, and food industries. Warren also encouraged the incorporation of computing and data management capabilities into LECO's instruments. By the 1980s, LECO was developing multi-element analytical instruments for inductively coupled plasma, glow discharge, atomic emission spectroscopy, and time-of-flight mass spectrometry. In 1997, LECO introduced a 500-spectra-per-second time-of-flight mass spectrometer, suitable for use in separation science. LECO also developed instruments for comprehensive two-dimensional gas chromatography.

In 2012, LECO opened the Elizabeth S. Warren Technical Centre for Separation Science, for research and development into separation science instrumentation. Warren retired as president of LECO in 2016. In 2017, LECO announced construction of a new building to be named in Robert Warren's honor.

== Philanthropy ==
In 2004, the Warrens and others arranged for the sale of LECO land in the Silver Beach area, to be transferred to the city of St. Joseph, Michigan for educational and recreational use. The Warrens have supported the Silver Beach Carousel Society, which has built a new carousel in the area, to replace one previously located in the Silver Beach Amusement Park.
