= Hach Company =

American chemistry equipment manufacturer

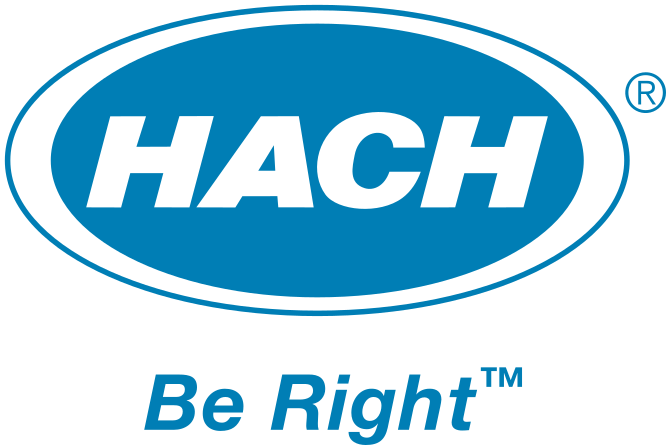
- Company type: Subsidiary
- Industry: Water Quality
- Founded: 1947; 79 years ago
- Headquarters: Loveland, Colorado, United States
- Area served: Worldwide
- Key people: Tom Bolling (President); Joe Moore (CFO); Clifford Hach (Co-Founder); Kathryn Hach-Darrow (Co-Founder); Dr Bruno Lange (Co-Founder)
- Products: Instrumentation, Chemistries
- Parent: Veralto
- Website: www.hach.com

Hach Company, a subsidiary of Veralto, manufactures and distributes analytical instruments and reagents used to test the quality of water and other liquid solutions. Manufactured and distributed worldwide, Hach systems are designed to simplify analysis by offering on-line instrumentation, portable laboratory equipment, prepared reagents, easy-to-follow methods, and technical support.

Hach’s global headquarters in Loveland, Colorado, houses research and development laboratories, instrument manufacturing operations, and the Hach Technical Training Center. Hach has an additional facility in Ames, Iowa, for manufacturing and packaging Hach's chemical reagents and test kits.

== History ==
=== 1947–1968: founding ===
External videos
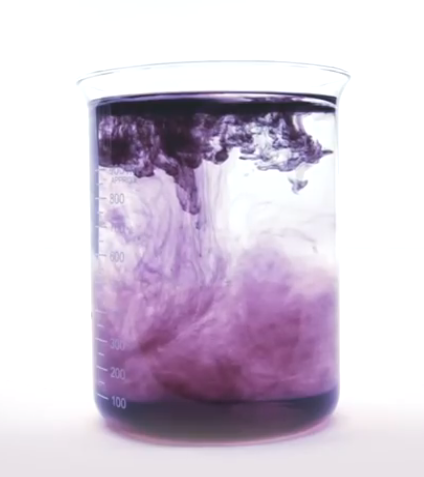
- Kathryn C. “Kitty” Hach-Darrow, "The water on this planet is all that we have. It needs to be cared for.", 15:04, Science History Institute

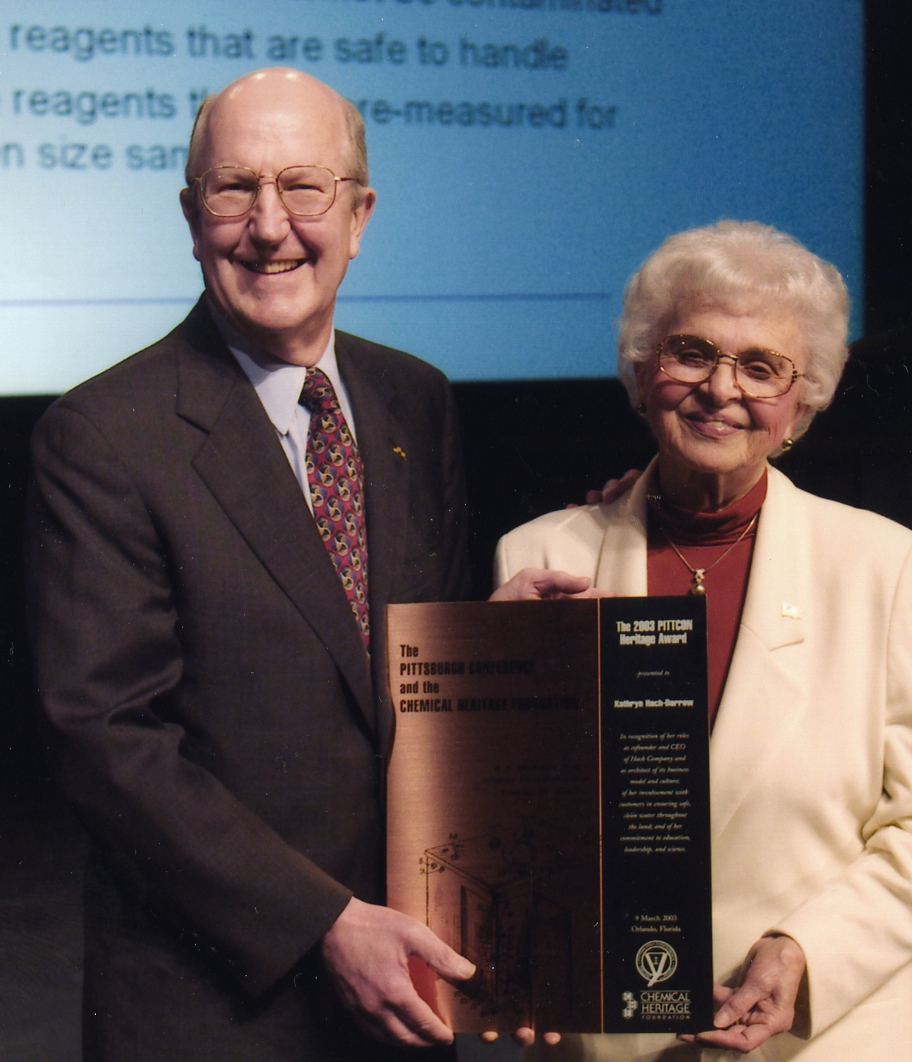
Kitty Hach-Darrow receiving the 2003 Pittcon Heritage Award from Arnold Thackray, head of the Chemical Heritage Foundation

Hach Company was founded in 1947, in Ames, Iowa, by Clifford and Kathryn Hach. Clifford Hach was a chemist and an inventor. The couple experienced their first business success through the development of a simplified titration method for measuring hardness in drinking water. As the product line expanded to include more parameters and instruments, the company continued to “bring analytical chemistry out of the laboratory and put it into the workplace and in the hands of the general public.” Initially, Kathryn Hach began marketing to municipal drinking water plants through direct mail.

The company was originally a partnership. In 1968, it was reincorporated in Delaware as Hach Chemical Co., with Clifford Hach president and treasurer and Kathryn Hach as vice-president. Later that year, Hach went public, raising $1.7 million with the sale of a small minority of the shares. Most of the money was used to build and equip a new chemical manufacturing plant in Ames.

=== 1970–1975: expanding boundaries ===
In 1970, Hach was manufacturing and marketing a line of instruments designed to determine specific water impurities. It was also manufacturing a manometric apparatus that measured the biochemical oxygen demand (BOD) of sewage and industrial wastes in lakes, rivers, and streams.

Hach was also manufacturing and selling more than 100 different portable water test kits for laboratory and field use. These kits were employed in water and sewage treatment, water conditioning, cooling towers, wildlife conservation, and boiler water. They usually included specially formulated chemical reagents in the form of small powder packets. Test results were achieved by visual comparison of samples against color standards after adding the prescribed reagents. The directions were designed for people without technical backgrounds to conduct tests. The first of Clifford Hach's 10-item criteria for company products was, "Can be used by anyone who can read”.

=== 1977–1995: restructuring ===
The demand for testing products grew as legislation was introduced mandating water quality standards, such as the Clean Water Act of 1977. Hach also focused on converting complex analysis into simplified procedures that were reliable and verifiable. These standard methods were compiled into Hach’s Water Analysis Handbook.

In 1977, Clifford Hach took the position of chairman and chief executive officer, and Kathryn Hach became president and chief operating officer the following year. In 1978, Hach moved its instrument division and its corporate headquarters to Loveland, Colorado. Hach Chemical Co. became Hach Company in 1980.

In 1985, Clifford Hach was chairman; Kathryn Hach was vice-chairman; and Stelios Papadopoulos was president of the company, which had grown to 580 employees. At that time, the company was being offered for sale at 50 million dollars.

Analytical instruments continue to be manufactured in Loveland, Colorado, where Hach also has its corporate headquarters, research, development, and engineering operations, Technical Training Center, and plastic component manufacturing operation. The chemical manufacturing operations, a chemical research laboratory, and the company warehouse and shipping operations are still in Ames, Iowa.

=== 1998 – present ===
In 1998, Hach expanded its portable testing capabilities with the acquisition of Environmental Test Systems Inc., in Elkhart, Indiana (USA). ETS develops, manufactures and markets diagnostic test strips for both consumer and industrial applications. ETS operations continue to be based in Elkhart.

In 1999, Hach became a wholly owned subsidiary of Danaher Corporation, which includes over 30 companies working in the process/environmental controls industries.

Also in 1999, the company acquired the German manufacturer Lange, and established additional product development and manufacturing in Düsseldorf. Lange, founded by Dr. Bruno Lange, is the distribution and support center for Hach's customers in Europe and Mediterranean Africa. Danaher acquired Lange, Hach, and numerous other brands, and a period of dramatic change occurred for each brand as lean production was introduced.

After 9/11 Hach began developing products for the emerging field of water distribution system security. In 2002, Hach formed a separate research and development division, Hach Homeland Security Technologies. Hach HST’s scientists and engineers set about developing a water distribution security system designed to detect and alarm operators to contaminants and accidents in real time. The result of their efforts was the first early warning system for drinking water designated and certified by the Department of Homeland Security.

In 2007, Hach created TNTplus, vials that contain premeasured reagent, and allow sample reaction and reading in a closed container. The next year, ISO 21501-compliant particle counters were added.

In 2009, Hach purchased the information management company OPS Systems and the assets of WaterEye Corporation.

In 2014, Hach purchased the Irish-based water analysis company Biotector Ltd. Biotector makes proprietary Total Organic Carbon (TOC) measurement systems.

At the end of September 2023, Danaher completed the corporate spin-off its Environmental and Applied Solutions segment, including Hach, as Veralto.

== Family brands ==
- ANATEL
- Hach Lange
- Environmental Test Strips
- Evita
- GLI
- HIAC
- Homeland Security Technologies
- Hydrolab
- IQ Scientific Instruments
- Lachat Instruments
- Leica Microsystems
- Marsh-McBirney
- MET ONE
- OPS Systems
- ORBISPHERE
- OTT HydroMet
- POLYMETRON
- Radiometer Analytical
- Sea-Bird Electronics
- Sigma
- WET Labs
