= David Goodall (chemist) =

British chemist

David M. Goodall
- Born: March 10, 1941; Manchester, England
- Died: January 15, 2025 (aged 83)
- Education: University of Oxford
- Awards: Chromatography Society Jubilee Medal (1991)
- Scientific career
- Fields: Analytical chemistry
- Institutions: Cornell University; University of York

David M. Goodall (10 March 1941 – 15 January 2025) was a British chemist. He was Emeritus Professor of chemistry affiliated with the University of York (UK). Throughout his career he made a considerable impact on the field of analytical chemistry.

== Achievements ==
Professor Goodall was one of the inventors of the UV imaging detection approach for applications in microscale chemical analysis. His scientific achievements include: development of separation methods based on capillary electrophoresis, real time visualisation of separations and reactions, imaging dissolution of pharmaceutical dosage forms, and high-sensitivity multiplexed detection in capillary electrophoresis and capillary liquid chromatography.

== Representative publications ==
- "Real-time image acquisition for absorbance detection and quantification in thin-layer chromatography." M Lancaster, D M Goodall, E T Bergström, S McCrossen and P Myers, Analytical Chemistry, 2006, 78, 905–911.
- "A charge coupled device (CCD) array detector for single- and multi-wavelength ultraviolet absorbance in capillary electrophoresis." Bergstrom, E.T.; Goodall, D.M.; Allinson, N M; Pokric, B., Analytical Chemistry, Vol. 71, No. 19, 1999, p. 4376-4384.

== See also ==
- Analytical chemistry
- Capillary electrophoresis
