= InXitu =

inXitu
- Company type: Private
- Industry: X-ray instrumentation
- Founded: 2007
- Defunct: 2012
- Fate: Purchased by Olympus
- Headquarters: Mountain View, California, United States
- Key people: Bradley Boyer (President, CEO); Philippe Sarrazin (CTO); Carmen Cerrelli (CFO); Robert J. Espinosa (Chairman)
- Products: XRD/XRF portable instruments
- Website: www.innovx.com

inXitu was a company based in Mountain View, California, which developed portable X-ray diffraction (XRD) and X-ray fluorescence (XRF) analysis instruments. The company name was a combination of the terms in situ and X-ray, portraying the company's dedication to developing X-ray instruments that could be easily transported to the original site of the material being analyzed.

== Company history ==
The basis for inXitu began in 2003 when Philippe Sarrazin worked with NASA to file a patent on techniques used to develop the CheMin instrument for the Mars Curiosity rover. Sarrazin left NASA to form inXitu Research, which received two Small Business Innovation Research grants from Ames Research Center in 2004 to continue work on CheMin. inXitu Research merged with Microwave Power Technology (MPT) in 2007 and incorporated as inXitu, Inc. MPT's research and development in high vacuum systems was meshed with inXitu's experience with XRD equipment, and in early 2008 the company released Terra, a commercial field-portable XRD/XRF instrument. Bradley Boyer joined the company as President and Chief Executive Officer in September 2008. inXitu formed a partnership with Innov-X in December 2008, in which inXitu would manufacture XRD equipment for sale under the Innov-X brand name.

Also in 2008, inXitu worked with the Getty Conservation Institute to develop X-Duetto, a portable and non-destructive XRD/XRF device used for the analysis of works of art. It was commercially released as Duetto in mid 2009. The company released the BTX instrument in mid 2009, which is a desktop XRD/XRF device developed from Terra; the second generation BTX-II was released in early 2010.

inXitu was purchased by Olympus in November 2011.
