= LECO Corporation =

- Founded: 1936
- Headquarters: St. Joseph, Michigan, USA
- Key people: Robert J. Warren, President
- Products: Analytical instrumentation
- Website: http://www.leco.com/

LECO Corporation, founded in 1936 by Carl Schultz and George Krasl, operates its analytical instrumentation research and development, and manufacturing from its headquarters located in St. Joseph, Michigan.

== About ==
LECO develops and manufactures elemental measurement and molecular Time-of-flight mass spectrometry instrumentation, following ISO 9000 standards. The LECO trademark is an acronym of the original name, Laboratory Equipment Company. One of LECO's early products was a combustion analyzer invented by Krasl in 1957 that used crucibles invented by his employee Eugene Bennet.

LECO carries out research in many fields of analytical chemistry including protein measurement in foods, sulfur in coal emissions, glow discharge emission in metals, multi-dimensional gas chromatograph mass spectrometry, environmental monitoring, air quality, Metabolomics, and diverse medical and pharmaceutical applications. LECO has been a manufacturer and distributor of metallographic equipment since the 1970s, and makes ceramic products for the foundry industry. LECO Corporation has sales subsidiaries worldwide.

On June 8, 1977, Robert J. Warren (1933-2022), husband of Elizabeth D. Schultz and son-in-law of Carl Schultz, and family, have become the sole owners of the company, acquiring outstanding stocks which had become the property of the George J. Krasl Trust following George Krasl's death on August 5, 1976. Bob Warren was hired by LECO in 1968 and became its president in 1975. LECO became a worldwide supplier of instruments and metallographic equipment under Warren's management, and one of southwestern Michigan's larger employers.

In 2012 LECO began a partnership with the Joint Mass Spectrometry Centre.

Warren was succeeded as CEO by his sons upon his retirement in 2016.

In 2023, LECO and Cal State LA worked in tandem to launch a new chemical analysis lab. The new lab would work with both undergraduate and graduate students within the Department of Chemistry and Biochemistry.

Since 2025, the cement industry has been working to reduce carbon emissions and adopt more sustainable production methods. The LECO Corporation provides analytical instrumentation to support that transition. Its portfolio has included calorimeters, thermogravimetric analyzers, and combustion analyzers that measure factors such as calorific value, moisture, ash, carbon, sulfur, and loss on ignition in fuels and raw materials. This helps cement producers evaluate alternative inputs, monitor performance, and improve operational efficiency while reducing environmental impact. Research was also conducted at Oxford by scholars within the Department of Materials which tested the LECO process of testing solar cells and silicon materials.

== See also ==
- Scientific instruments
