= Pittsburgh Conference on Analytical Chemistry and Applied Spectroscopy =

Pittcon
- The Pittsburgh Conference on Analytical Chemistry & Applied Spectroscopy
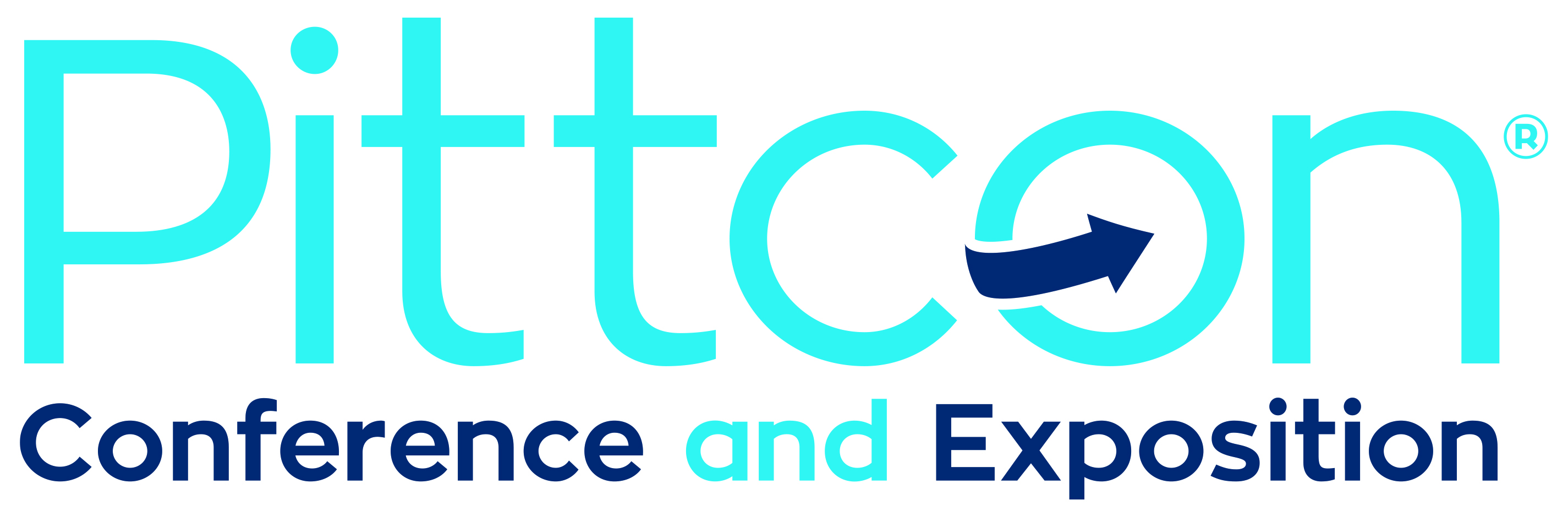
- Formation: February 15, 1950; 76 years ago
- Type: Nonprofit
- Purpose: Advancing and enriching scientific endeavor by connecting scientists worldwide, facilitating the exchange of research and ideas, showcasing the latest in laboratory innovation, and funding science education and outreach.
- Products: Scientific Conference, Laboratory Products and Services Exposition
- Fields: Laboratory Science, Analytical Chemistry
- Website: http://www.pittcon.org/

The Pittsburgh Conference on Analytical Chemistry and Applied Spectroscopy, referred to internationally as Pittcon, is a non-profit educational organization based in Pennsylvania that organizes an annual Conference and Exposition on laboratory science. It is sponsored by the Spectroscopy Society of Pittsburgh and the Society for Analytical Chemists of Pittsburgh. The Conference has traditionally been the most attended annual conference on analytical chemistry and applied spectroscopy in the world, with attendance of approximately 20,000 people in the period of 2005-2011. Pittcon presents several awards each year to individuals who have made outstanding contributions to the various fields in analytical chemistry.
