= Dionex =

Dionex Corporation
- Company type: Subsidiary
- Headquarters: Sunnyvale, California, US
- Key people: A. Blaine Bowman, variously chairman, president, chief executive officer, and director, 1980-2011, Frank Witney, president and chief executive officer, 2009-2011
- Products: chromatography, ion chromatography and extraction systems
- Parent: Thermo Fisher Scientific
- Website: Thermo Scientific Dionex

Dionex Corporation is an American company based in Sunnyvale, California. It develops, manufactures, sells, and services analytical chromatography systems for separating, isolating, and identifying the components of chemical mixtures. Such equipment is used in pharmaceutical manufacturing, medical research, environmental monitoring, and food testing.

In December 2010 Thermo Fisher Scientific announced its acquisition of Dionex for $2.1 billion.

== Products ==
=== Software ===
Dionex developed the Chromeleon brand of chromatography software. The primary function of Chromeleon is to control and obtain data from analytical instruments, such as GC, LC, IEX and MS. Chromeleon is fully Title 21 CFR Part 11 compliant. Chromeleon 7.3 is the latest edition of the software.

=== Hardware ===
The technology made by Dionex includes the Rapid Separation LC (RSLC) and polymeric HPLC columns, a type of monolithic HPLC column. Unlike the inorganic silica columns, the polymer monoliths are made of an organic polymer base. Dionex, traditionally known for its ion chromatography capabilities, has led this side of the field. Dionex first acquired a license for the polymeric monolith technology in the 1990s. Dionex also acquired ESA Biosciences' HPLC assets in 2009, expanding its expertise in this area.
