= Life Sciences Foundation =

Former nonprofit organization

- Founded: 2010
- Type: 501(c)
- Purpose: Biotechnology
- Location: San Francisco, California, U.S.
- Key people: Arnold Thackray, Founding President and CEO
- Website: Life Sciences Foundation

Life Sciences Foundation (LSF) was a San Francisco-based nonprofit organization that was established in 2011 to collect, preserve, interpret, and promote the history of biotechnology. LSF conducted historical research, maintained archives and published historically relevant materials and information.

On December 1, 2015, the LSF and the Chemical Heritage Foundation finalized a merger, creating one organization that covers "the history of the life sciences and biotechnology together with the history of the chemical sciences and engineering."

As of February 1, 2018, the organization was renamed the Science History Institute, to reflect its wider range of historical interests, from chemical sciences and engineering to the life sciences and biotechnology. The organization is headquartered in Philadelphia but retains offices in the San Francisco Bay area.

== Mandate ==
The LSF mandate was to collect and promote the history of biotechnology. This includes telling the stories of "scientists, inventors, entrepreneurs, managers, executives, and financiers" in order to "humanize" biotechnology to a lay audience. The history of the biotechnology industry includes examining the complex relationships and socio-political dynamics that occur when science and entrepreneurship come together.

== History ==
The idea for a foundation that would collect and share the history of biotechnology came about at a meeting in early January 2009 in San Francisco attended by G. Steven Burrill of Burrill & Company, Dennis Gillings of Quintiles in Durham, NC, John Lechleiter of Eli Lilly and Company, Henri Termeer, then CEO of Genzyme and Arnold Thackray, founding President and CEO of the Chemical Heritage Foundation (CHF)

Five years ago, G. Steven Burrill was part of a small group of biotech leaders who came together to discuss the importance of capturing the great stories and lessons of the biotech pioneers for future generations. From this meeting, the Life Sciences Foundation was formed in 2010.

— Life Sciences Foundation 2014

Thackray had shaped Chemical Heritage Foundation—"the premier institution preserving the history of chemistry, chemical engineering, and related sciences and technologies." Oral history was one component of the CHF mandate of preserving interpreting, and promoting the history of science.

In 1982 the University of Pennsylvania and the American Chemical Society had launched the Center for the History of Chemistry which was renamed the Chemical Heritage Foundation (CHF) in 1992. Thackray, a Fellow of American Academy of Arts and Sciences, the Royal Historical Society and the Royal Society of Chemistry, Thackray received his M.A. and Ph.D. degrees in the history of science from Cambridge University.

Thackray argued that before LSF was founded, the recorded history of biotechnology was "fragmented, uneven, and rather paltry." He observed that, "If you don't write your own history, somebody else will do it for you, and they may be hostile."

There is a valuable heritage here. The life sciences will shape the course of the 21st century. We need to preserve their history. We need to teach young people about the world in which they live ... Records are being scattered, memories are fading, stories are disappearing. Once lost, they're gone forever.

— Arnold Thackray

By the end of 2011, LSF's steering committee of industry leaders— Joshua Boger, Robert Carpenter, Bob Coughlin, Henri Termeer and Peter Wirth— were promoting the foundation's work by encouraging scientists and industrialists who were members of the Massachusetts Biotechnology Council, to contribute potential stories and materials to the archival record of the history of biotechnology in Boston and the surrounding region.

== Oral History Program ==
The Life Sciences Foundation conducted oral history interviews with scientists, entrepreneurs, executives, policy makers, and leaders of thought in the biotechnology industry. LSF's hosts timelines, transcripts and audio recordings and provides links to existing oral histories housed at institutions across the globe.

== Archives ==
Original documentary materials pertinent to the history of biotechnology and the life sciences are being collected. The materials include personal papers and correspondence, donated company records, laboratory notebooks, photographs, video and audio recordings. Collected materials will be guided to permanent repositories in appropriate institutional settings. Electronic reproductions will be made available to scholars, journalists, educators, and the general public in a digital archive.

== Publications ==
LSF historians work on a range of publications including a quarterly magazine, scholarly articles, white papers, and books. These works are intended for multiple audiences and focused on the emergence and evolution of biotechnologies in pharmaceutical discovery and development, agriculture, energy production, and environmental remediation. In October 2011, the University of Chicago Press released Genentech: The Beginnings of Biotech by Life Sciences Foundation historian Sally Smith Hughes.

== Board of directors ==
Founding partners of the Life Sciences Foundation include Burrill, Celgene, John Lechleiter, Genentech, Henri Termeer, Merck & Co., Millennium, Pfizer, Quintiles, and Thermo Fisher. MIT professor, Phillip Sharp, serves as LSF's academic advisor. Its executive and advisory board members are leaders from biotech, venture capital, academic institutions and trade associations.

When Thackray retired in 2012, Heather R. Erickson, 34, was appointed as LSF President and CEO and member of the Board of Directors. Thackray remained as LSF advisor to its scholarly activities. The Board also includes Brook Byers of Kleiner Perkins Caufield & Byers in Menlo Park, California, Carl B. Feldbaum of Biotechnology Industry Organization (BIO) in Washington, DC who replaced Burrill, Frederick Frank of EVOLUTION Life Science Partners in New York, NY, Gillings in Durham, NC, Lechleiter in Indianapolis, IN, Scott Morrison from San Francisco, CA, Ivor Royston, MD, of Forward Ventures in San Diego, CA, Phillip Sharp from Massachusetts Institute of Technology in Cambridge, MA and Henri Termeer in Cambridge, MA. The first board of directors also included G. Steven Burrill, CEO of Burrill & Company— who also published The Journal of Life Sciences and Joshua Boger, former chairman and CEO of Vertex Pharmaceuticals.
