= Biotechnology Innovation Organization =

Biotechnology advocacy association

- Nickname: BIO
- Founded: 1993
- Headquarters: Washington, D.C.
- Key people: John Crowley (CEO)
- Website: https://www.bio.org/
- Formerly called: Biotechnology Industry Organization

The Biotechnology Innovation Organization (BIO) is the largest advocacy association in the world representing the biotechnology industry. It was founded in 1993 as the Biotechnology Industry Organization from a merger of the Industrial Biotechnology Association and the Association of Biotechnology Companies, and changed its name to the Biotechnology Innovation Organization on January 4, 2016. Biotechnology Innovation Organization serves more than 1,100 biotechnology firms, research schools, state biotechnology centers and related associations in the United States and in more than 30 other countries.

== Activities ==
=== Annual conference ===
BIO holds its annual international conference, the BIO International Convention, each year in the United States. This conference provides networking, business development and partnering activities that are essential to the biotechnology industry, in which developing products take considerable time and resources and regulatory risks are high. In 2021, BIO shifted its in-person meetings to virtual, due to restrictions and difficulties arising from the COVID-19 pandemic. However, the in-person meetings recommenced in 2022 in San Diego.

=== Lobbying ===
In 2018, BIO spent $9.87 million on lobbying the government of the United States. Past issues that BIO has lobbied on included the amending the Internal Revenue Code to provide an exception from the passive loss rules for investments in high-technology research small business pass-through entities, to include vaccines against seasonal influenza within the definition of taxable vaccines, and to extend, expand, and improve the qualifying therapeutic discovery project program that first became law in 2010.

Examples of its public lobbying efforts, include support for development of biofuels such as those produced from algae, genetically modified crops, strong intellectual property rights, and for a more efficient and predictable regulatory process for new food and drug products.

=== Alliances ===
In June 2013 BIO partnered with the Coalition of Small Business Innovators to lobby the U.S. government to modernize the U.S. tax code "to recognize and promote small business innovation as fundamental to the long-term growth of the U.S. economy".

It is a member of The Alliance to Feed the Future, an umbrella network, the mission of which is to "raise awareness and improve understanding of the benefits & necessity of modern food production and technology in order to meet global demand".

=== Industry initiatives ===
The "Right Mix Matters" campaign launched in 2019 targets diversity within biopharmaceutical company leadership, including ongoing assessment of diversity measures (gender, race, ethnicity, sexual orientation) and the provision of online tools aimed at assisting companies to achieve target diversity goals.

== Organization ==
=== Members ===
BIOs members include companies that make pharmaceutical drugs, biofuels, industrial enzymes, and genetically modified crops, as well as healthcare facilities that participate in clinical trials and biopharmaceutical research. As of 2016, it represents 1,100 biotech companies in all 50 U.S. states, which employ 1.61 million Americans and support an additional 3.4 million jobs.

=== Leadership ===
BIO was founded in 1993 in Washington, D.C., and Carl B. Feldbaum was the president from BIO's founding until he retired in 2004. He was succeeded by James C. Greenwood who held the offices of president and CEO from 2005 to 2020.

The association has a 120-member board, consisting of a diverse mix of company executives based upon size, geography, and pharmaceutical focus. The board's executive committee consists of 21 members, purposefully designed to ensure a representative voice for the smaller companies among BIO's membership.

After Greenwood's 15 years of service, the BIO board announced scientist and former Food and Drug Administration regulator Michelle McMurry-Heath would become president and CEO as of 1 June 2020. McMurry-Heath was placed on leave sometime prior to October 6, 2022, reportedly as a result of disagreements with a small but influential group of board members who wanted the organization to use its influence to advance social issues not directly connected to its industry interests. Additionally, questions had been raised by some board members about her performance and management style. Heath resigned effective October 11, 2022, with GlycoMimetics co-founder and former CEO Rachel King selected to serve as interim CEO of the organization. In 2023, John Crowley, executive chairman of Amicus Therapeutics, was announced as BIO's next CEO. Crowley has a background in rare diseases and is credited with working on a drug to save his children's and all individuals with Pompe disease's hearts. His work was the subject of the movie Extraordinary Measures.

== Biotechnology Heritage Award ==
The Biotechnology Heritage Award, presented annually at the BIO's Annual International Convention by the BIO and the Science History Institute (formerly the Chemical Heritage Foundation), recognizes individuals who have made significant contributions to the development of biotechnology through discovery, innovation, and public understanding.
