= Ullyot Public Affairs Lecture =

- Date: 1997
- Presented by: Science History Institute, American Chemical Society (ACS), University of Pennsylvania, University of the Sciences

The Ullyot Public Affairs Lecture is an annual public lecture which focuses on contributions of the sciences (in particular chemistry and biology) to the public welfare. The lecture is presented jointly by the Science History Institute, the American Chemical Society (ACS), the University of Pennsylvania, and the University of the Sciences. The lecture was endowed in 1990 by Glenn Edgar Ullyot, a research chemist at Smith, Kline & French, and his wife Barbara Hodsdon Ullyot. Since 1997, the lecture has been presented at the Science History Institute (formerly the Chemical Heritage Foundation) in Philadelphia, Pennsylvania.

== Recipients ==
External videos
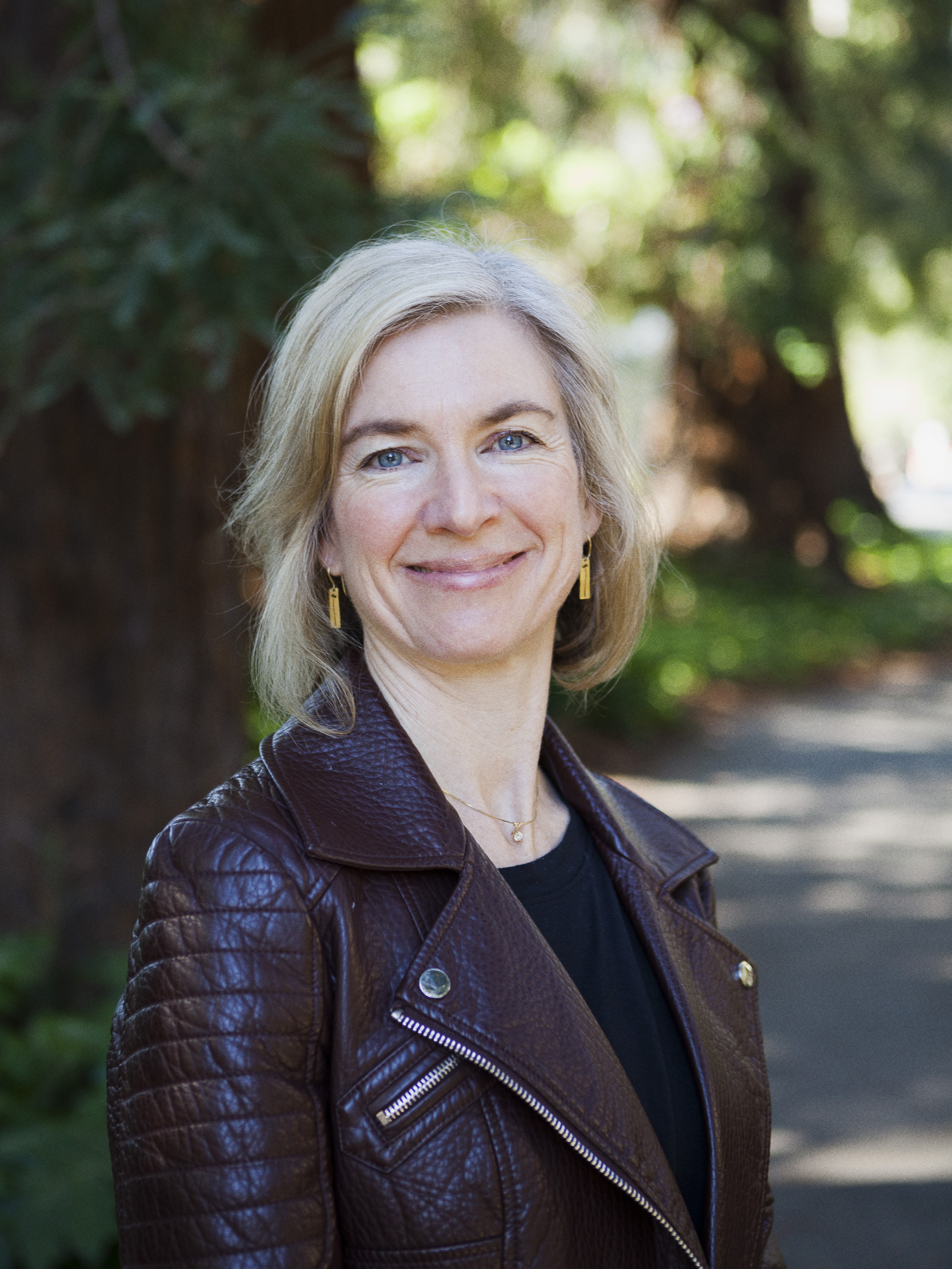
- “Jennifer Doudna, “CRISPR Biology and Biotechnology: The Future of Genome Editing”, Ullyot lecture, 2018

The award is given yearly and was first presented in 1990.

- 2024, Omar M. Yaghi, University of California, Berkeley
- 2023, Carolyn Bertozzi , Stanford University
- 2022, Frances Arnold, Caltech
- 2020, Peter Agre, Johns Hopkins Bloomberg School of Public Health
- 2019, Roald Hoffmann, Cornell University
- 2018, Jennifer Doudna, University of California, Berkeley
- 2017, Marcia McNutt, president of the National Academy of Sciences
- 2016, Sir James Fraser Stoddart, Nobel Laureate in Chemistry
- 2015, Bruce Alberts, “education president” of the National Academy of Sciences
- 2014, George M. Whitesides, Harvard University
- 2013, Joe Palca, National Public Radio (NPR) science correspondent
- 2012, Paul Anastas, Yale University
- 2011, Michael Christman, President and CEO, Coriell Institute for Medical Research
- 2010, Susan Solomon, National Oceanic and Atmospheric Administration
- 2009, Joseph M. DeSimone, University of North Carolina at Chapel Hill
- 2008, Bernard Bigot, High Commissioner of the French Atomic Energy Commission and Professor of Chemistry and Physics at the École Normale Supérieure de Lyon
- 2007, Shirley M. Tilghman, President, Princeton University
- 2006, Ralph J. Cicerone, President, National Academy of Sciences
- 2005, Marye Anne Fox, Chancellor of the University of California, San Diego
- 2004, Phillip A. Sharp,Massachusetts Institute of Technology
- 2003, Alfred Bader, Aldrich Chemical Company
- 2002, Jacqueline K. Barton, California Institute of Technology
- 2001, Robert S. Langer, Massachusetts Institute of Technology
- 2000, Mark S. Wrighton, Chancellor, Washington University in St. Louis
- 1999, George B. Rathmann, Founding CEO of Amgen
- 1998, Earnest W. Deavenport, Jr., Chairman and CEO, Eastman Chemical Company
- 1997, P. Roy Vagelos, former CEO of Merck & Co.
- 1996, Harold E. Varmus, Director, National Cancer Institute
- 1995, Carl Djerassi, Stanford University
- 1994, Orlando Aloysius Battista, Director, Carrington Laboratories
- 1993, Bassam Shakhashiri, Assistant Director, National Science Foundation (NSF)
- 1992, Maxine F. Singer, Carnegie Institution for Science
- 1991, Harry B. Gray, Beckman Institute at Caltech
- 1990, Mary L. Good, Chair, National Science Foundation

== See also ==
- List of chemistry awards
