= Michelle McMurry-Heath =

American immunologist

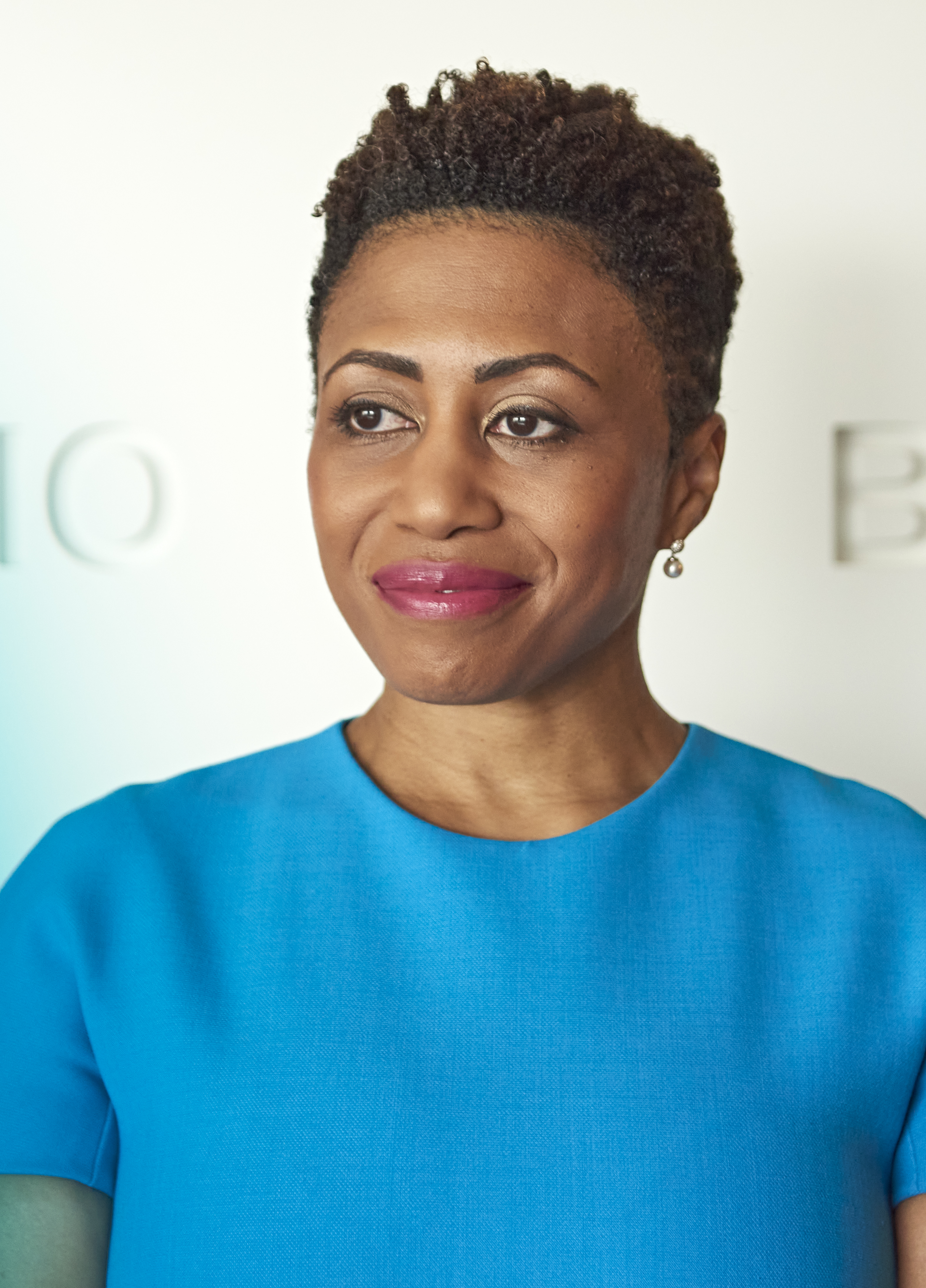
- McMurry-Heath in 2020
- Born: Oakland, California
- Education: Harvard University (BS); Duke University (MD, PhD)
- Scientific career
- Fields: Health policy
- Workplaces: Biotechnology Innovation Organization, Johnson & Johnson, Food and Drug Administration

Michelle McMurry-Heath is an American medical doctor, immunologist, and from June 2020 to October 2022 was chief executive officer for the Biotechnology Innovation Organization (BIO).

== Early life and education ==
McMurry-Heath was born and raised in Oakland, California. Her mother was a public health nurse, and her father was a psychologist.

After first pursuing a double major in art history and psychology during college, she changed her focus to biochemistry and received an undergraduate degree from Harvard University in biochemistry. She is the first Black graduate of the Duke University combined MD / Ph.D. Medical Scientist Training Program, and completed her Ph.D. in immunology.

== Career ==
After completing her education, McMurry-Heath worked in research for 12 years. After training from the Robert Wood Johnson Foundation, she shifted to science policy, which included work from 2001 to 2004 as a legislative aide for Senator Joe Lieberman and drafting a bioterrorism preparedness bill in 2002.

During her work with the Aspen Institute, she was a founding director of the Aspen Institute's Health, Biomedical Science, and Society Policy Program. She also worked as an adjunct assistant professor of health policy at George Washington University. In 2010, she became the associate director at the Center for Devices and Radiological Health at the Food and Drug Administration. In this role, she developed partnerships with medical device nonprofits.

Towards the end of 2014, she became an executive at Johnson & Johnson and her management role later expanded. While at Johnson & Johnson, she was advised by Michael D. Watkins, who continued as an advisor after she moved to her role as president and CEO of the Biotechnology Innovation Organization (BIO).

She has previously worked with the Council on Foreign Relations. From 2018 to 2020, she was Chair of the NESTcc Governing Committee. She is a member of the AAAS Committee on Science, Engineering and Public Policy (COSEPP).

In June 2020, McMurry-Heath became the chief executive of the Biotechnology Innovation Organization (BIO), a lobbying organization that represents several hundred biotech companies, including most of the companies that developed COVID-19 vaccines, as well as academic institutions. At BIO, she led the Coronavirus Collaboration Initiative, a group focused on developing COVID-19 vaccines and treatments. In 2021, she was named as a possible nominee to lead the Food and Drug Administration.

McMurry-Heath resigned from her role as CEO of BIO effective October 2022, and continues to be an advisor to the board.

== Fellowships ==
- AAAS Science and Technology Policy Fellow
- Robert Wood Johnson Foundation Health and Society Scholar

== Personal life ==
McMurry-Heath is married to Sebastian Heath, a veterinarian. They have one daughter and currently live in Washington, D.C.
