= Thomas R. Tritton =

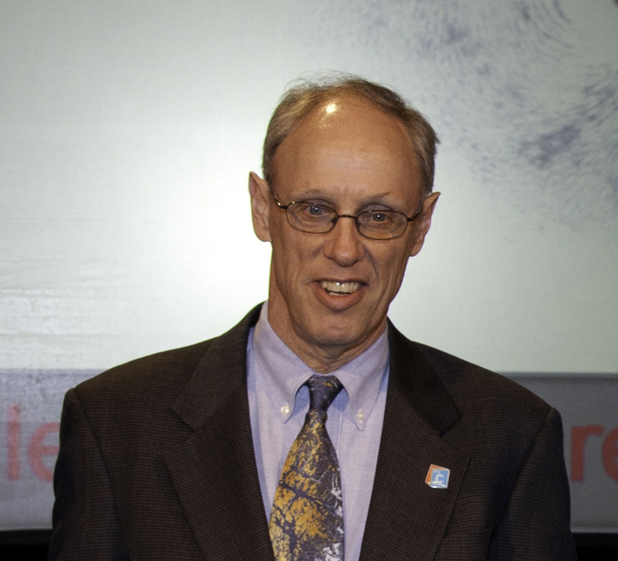
Thomas R. Tritton, 2011, Chemical Heritage Foundation

Thomas R. Tritton was the twelfth president of Haverford College, serving from 1997 to 2007. After his presidency, he served as president in residence at the Harvard Graduate School of Education. From 2008 to 2013, he served as president and CEO of the Chemical Heritage Foundation.

Tritton graduated from Ohio Wesleyan University in 1969. He earned a Ph.D. in biophysical chemistry from Boston University in 1973, and was a faculty member for 12 years each at Yale University and the University of Vermont.
