= David Gollaher =

American historian and biotechnology executive

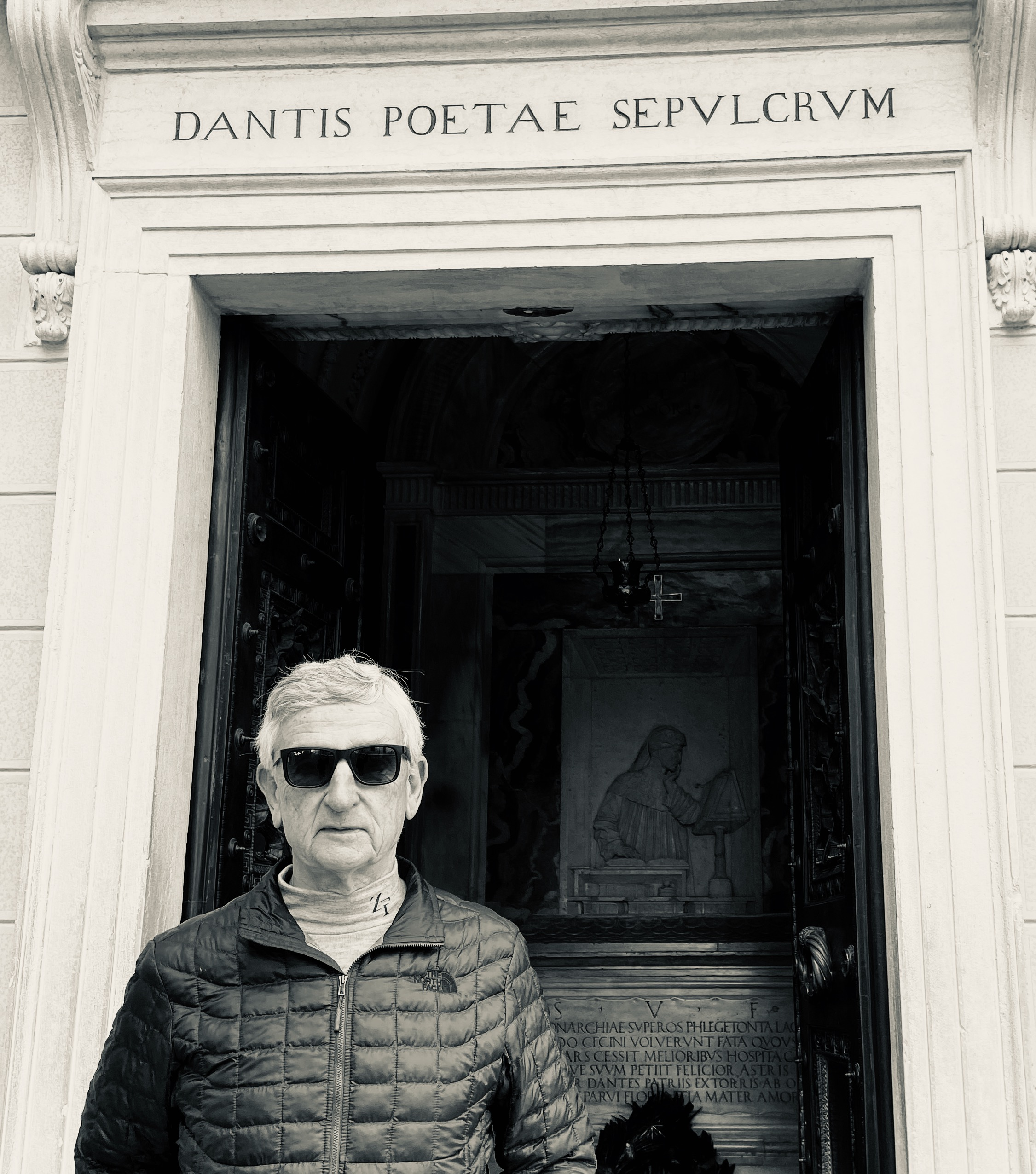
Dante's tomb in Ravenna

David L. Gollaher was the founding President & CEO of the California Healthcare Institute (CHI), 1993–2014, from which he joined Gilead Sciences. Initially, in 1998, he was a charter member of Gilead's Health Policy Advisotry Board, then, from 2014 to 2018, he served as the company's head of worldwide Government Affairs and Policy. Subsequently, in early 2019, he was appointed Senor Vice President of global policy and government affairs at Vir Biotechnology, an emerging growth biotech company focused on infectious diseases. He retired from Vir in 2021. Previously, in 2018, he was named Senior Fellow at the Leonard D. Schaeffer Center for Health Policy and Economics at the University of Southern California.

Gollaher began his career as an historian of science and medicine. He completed undergraduate studies with honors at University of California and received his masters and Ph.D. degrees from Harvard University. Subsequently, he was a fellow of Harvard's Houghton Library, the National Endowment for the Humanities and is a member of the Massachusetts Historical Society. Gollaher's biographical study, Voice for the Mad: The Life of Dorothea Dix received the Organization of American Historians' 1996 Avery O. Craven Award. His next book, Circumcision: A History of the World's Most Controversial Surgery, was the first full medical scholarly history of the subject.

In 1993, after several years as a member of the executive team at Scripps Clinic and Research Foundation, Gollaher organized California biotechnology industry leaders to found CHI, a public policy research and advocacy organization that grew to represent more than 370 California academic institutions, biopharmaceutical companies, medical technology and professional firms. While serving as CHI's president, he co-founded and served as senior editor of The Journal of Life Sciences, a bi-monthly publication covering the science and business of biotechnology. In 2014, his leadership and contributions to human health research and development were formally acknowledged in the Congressional Record by Representative Anna Eshoo (D - Palo Alto). After he left CHI, the association merged with BayBio to create the California Life Sciences Association (CLSA). In 2003, he was appointed to the California State Legislature's Stem Cell Advisory Panel, and to the U.S. Congressional Homeland Security Advisory Committee. Gollaher has served on the Advisory Board of the J. David Gladstone Institutes, the California Council on Science and Technology, and the Board of Overseers for Scripps Research. In 2018, he joined the board of Cidara Therapeutics (CDTX), a public biotechnology firm developing treatments for infectious diseases and oncology. Beyond biotechnology, he was a co-founder and is a board member of Vision Robotics Corporation, sharing patents in the field of autonomous robotic navigation.

== Bibliography ==
- Congressional Record Volume 160, Number 27 (Friday, February 14, 2014)
- California's Biomedical Industry: 2008 Report (CHI/PriceWaterhouseCoopers: 2008)
- California Biomedical Industry Report: 2010 (CHI/BayBio/PwC)
- Competitiveness and Regulation: The FDA and the Future of America's Biomedical Industry (CHI/Boston Consulting Group: February 2011)
- Circumcision: A History of the World's Most Controversial Surgery (New York: Basic Books, 2000)
- Das verletzte Geschlecht: Die Geschichte der Beschneidung (Berlin: Aufbau-Verlag, 2002)
- Voice for the Mad: The Life of Dorothea Dix (New York: Free Press, 1995)
- 'The Paradox of Genetic Privacy,' New York Times January 7, 1998
- The Journal of Life Sciences
- https://www.congress.gov/113/crec/2014/02/14/CREC-2014-02-14-pt1-PgE211-3.pdf
