= Arnold Thackray =

British science historian

Arnold Wilfrid Thackray
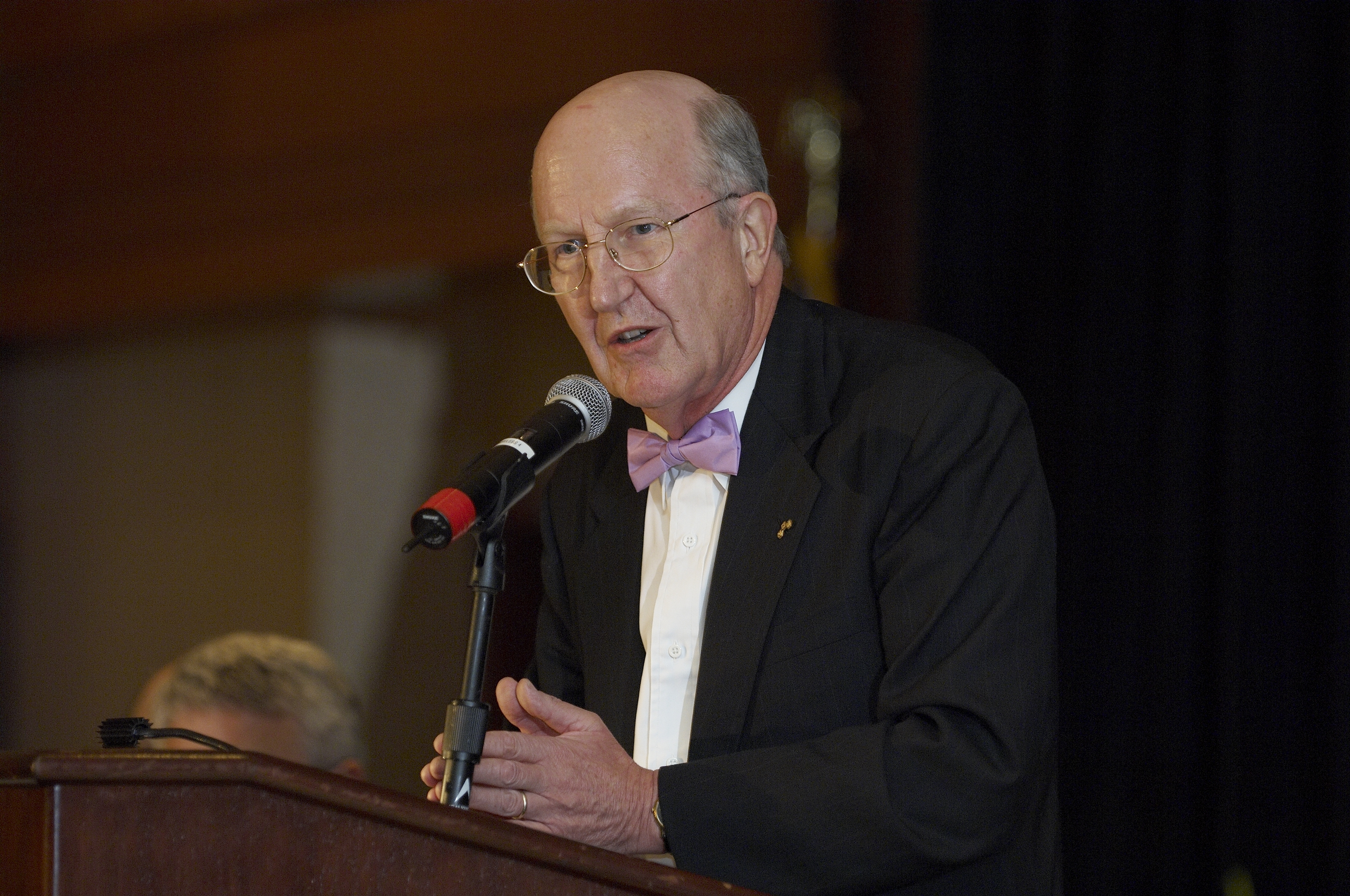
- Arnold Thackray, 2005
- Born: July 30, 1939 (age 87) northwest England
- Occupation: Science historian
- Known for: Founding President of the Chemical Heritage Foundation
- Title: Joseph Priestley Professor Emeritus
- Awards: Dexter Award

Academic background
- Education: Cambridge University
- Thesis: (1966)
- Doctoral advisor: Mary Hesse

Academic work
- Discipline: History of Science

Arnold Thackray (born 30 July 1939) is an emeritus professor at the University of Pennsylvania. He has held academic positions at institutions, including a visiting fellowship at All Souls College, Oxford, and a fellowship at Churchill College, Cambridge. He has also taught at the London School of Economics, Harvard University, the Institute for Advanced Study, the Center for Advanced Study in the Behavioral Sciences at Stanford, and the Hebrew University of Jerusalem.

He was the founding chair of the Department of History and Sociology of Science and now holds the title of Joseph Priestley Professor Emeritus.

Thackray was the founding director of the institution originally established as the Chemical Heritage Foundation, now known as the Science History Institute.

== Early life and education ==
Thackray was born in Manchester England on 30 July 1939.

At the age of 10, he was awarded a Foundation Scholarship to attend Manchester Grammar School.

He earned a Bachelor of Science degree with First Class Honours in chemistry from the University of Bristol in 1960. After graduation, he began working in industry in Yorkshire. During this time, he became involved with a group at Leeds University, led by Jerome Ravetz, that explored emerging ideas in the history of science.

Ravetz encouraged Thackray to apply to the fledging doctoral program in history of science at Cambridge University. In October 1963 Thackray entered recently established Churchill College, Cambridge University. Under the direction of Mary Hesse, a leader in the field of philosophy of science, he earned his Doctorate of Philosophy degree in 1966.

A year earlier, Thackray had already become the first graduate student at Churchill College to be elected a Fellow of the college. In this new role, he pioneered the effort to secure the papers of leading British scientists including Sir James Chadwick, for what in 1973 would become the Churchill College Archive Centre.

== Academic and professional career ==
Thackray decided to seek his BTA—his 'been to America' degree. In September 1967 he intermitted his Fellowship to accept a one-year visiting lectureship at Harvard University, fully intending to return to the original Cambridge. However, enjoying American academe, in 1968 he chose to join the faculty of the University of Pennsylvania.

In 1969 he became director of a joint Penn-Bryn Mawr-American Philosophical Society graduate program in the history of medicine and the biological sciences. In 1970 he became chairman of Penn's Department of the History and Philosophy of Science, which soon thereafter was renamed the Department of the History and Sociology of Science in order to be more consistent with the direction that Thackray had chosen for it. As chairman of the brand-new HSS Department, Thackray drew on faculty members from such disciplinary areas of the university as history, philosophy, anthropology, sociology, chemistry, physics, biology, engineering, English, and American civilization.

Thackray was a member of the Penn faculty for 28 years, retiring in 1996 as Joseph Priestley Professor emeritus.

His academic research has focused on the rise of modern science since the death of Isaac Newton, and on the interactions between the scientific community and society as a whole. He has mentored twenty PhD students and authored or edited a wide variety of scholarly books and articles. Additionally, he has been a member of the History of Science Society Executive Committee and editor of Isis and the HSS Newsletter (1978-1985), while also relaunching and editing Osiris (1984-1994). Additionally, Thackray has held visiting professorships at Bryn Mawr College (1968 through 1973), the London School of Economics (1971-1972), the Hebrew University of Jerusalem (1978), in addition to the Institute for Advanced Study, Princeton, NJ (1980), and the Center for Advanced Study in the Behavioral Sciences, Palo Alto, CA (1974 and 1984).

He also served as an Executive Committee member and Treasurer of the American Council of Learned Societies (1985-1995). He was one of the four co-founders of, and the 1982-83 President of, the Society for Social Studies of Science. He also participated on many review committees and advisory boards, such as those of the John Simon Guggenheim Memorial Foundation and the National Science Foundation. In his years at Penn, Arnold Thackray additionally served as curator of The Edgar Fahs Smith Memorial Collection in the History of Chemistry.

=== Chemical Heritage Foundation ===
A 1979-1980 task force led by chemist/historian John H. Wotiz resulted in a recommendation to the American Chemical Society that it create a center for the history of chemistry. In 1981, the American Chemical Society solicited proposals to develop such a center. Thackray proposed that the center be at the University of Pennsylvania. Late in 1983, the American Institute of Chemical Engineers (AIChE) became a co-sponsor.

In 1987 CHOC was promised its first endowment.

Thackray sought to move CHF to a home of its own somewhere in the greater Philadelphia (Wilmington, DE to Princeton, NJ) area. In 1993 CHF purchased the First National Bank, which stood in the backyard of Benjamin Franklin's home, within what by the 1980s had become Philadelphia's Independence National Park. The build-out of this 1865 structure into a modern 120,000 sq. ft. facility took over a decade of planning and fundraising. The repurposed complex eventually included offices, archives, and space for the Othmer Library (itself steadily growing in size and stature as an internationally-acclaimed resource). The home of CHF would eventually include a capacious public museum designed by Ralph Appelbaum. The overall project was complete in 2008. Under Thackray's tenure, CHF steadily expanded its scope, its sponsoring organizations, its repertoire of visiting academic scholars, and its activities around the country and overseas. An annual Othmer Gold Medal was inaugurated in 1997, to honor individuals contributing to science through innovation, entrepreneurship, research, legislation, and philanthropy. The Award’s four sponsors were the ACS, the AIChE, The Chemists' Club, and the Société de Chimie Industrielle (American Section). A growing series of other medals and prizes followed, in partnership with relevant organizations in the USA and abroad, to honor pioneers in fields ranging from materials science to biotechnology.

Thackray served as president of CHF until 2009, after which time he served a seven-year term as Chancellor. Over the 28 years of his active leadership of a growing organization, he raised a permanent endowment of $130 million, while investing almost $50 million to create CHF’s home.

=== Life Sciences Foundation ===
After stepping down as president of CHF, Thackray relocated to Silicon Valley. There he founded the Life Sciences Foundation . The foundation was conceived at a 2009 meeting with four biotechnology industry leaders. The group reasoned that biotech, by then 40 years old, had a poorly understood history. The Life Sciences Foundation was formed in 2011 to capture the stories of the industry’s founders, while increasing awareness of the field’s significance through oral histories, public events, and a variety of publications, including a free magazine.

== Awards and honors ==
Thackray was the 1983 recipient of the Dexter Award of the American Chemical Society for his work on the history of chemistry. In 1984, Thackray received the George Sarton Memorial Lecturer Award at the American Association for the Advancement of Science with a presentation entitled "The Historian's Calling in the Age of Science". He was twice awarded fellowships from the John Simon Guggenheim Memorial Foundation (1971 and 1985). Thackray is a Fellow of the American Academy of Arts and Sciences, the American Association for the Advancement of Science, the Royal Historical Society and the Royal Society of Chemistry Sigma XI, and the American Chemical Society, which sponsored a symposium in his honor in 2009.

== Personal life ==
Thackray became a citizen of the United States in 1981. He first married Barbara (née Hughes) Thackray, a physicist who became a teacher at the Shipley School in Bryn Mawr, Pennsylvania. He is the father of Helen Thackray, a biotechnology executive. Thackray's wife since 1994 is Diana (née Schueler) Thackray. Walking, gardening, reading, and raising roses have been his hobbies.

== Selected publications ==
- Thackray, Arnold (24 August 2022). Sturchio, Jeffrey L.; Lewenstein, Bruce V. (eds.). Science: Has its Present Past a Future?: Selected Essays. Seasons Associates Publishing. pp. 112–133. ISBN 979-8551167730.
- Thackray, Arnold; Ulrych, Richard (2017). Building a Petrochemical Industry in Saudi Arabia: A Vision Becomes a Reality : the Life of Abdulaziz Abdullah Al-Zamil Former Minister of Industry & Electricity. Obeikan. Also in Arabic. ISBN 978-603-02-4331-0.
- Thackray, Arnold; Brock, David C.; Jones, Rachel; Brock, Davd C. (2015). Moore's law: the life of Gordon Moore, Silicon Valley's quiet revolutionary. New York, NY: Basic Books. ISBN 978-0465055647. Chinese translation Moore's law: the life of Gordon Moore, Silicon Valley's quiet revolutionary (2017) Renmin University of China Press ISBN 978-7300239231
- Thackray, Arnold, ed. (1998). Private science: biotechnology and the rise of the molecular sciences. Philadelphia, Pa: Univ. of Pennsylvania Press. ISBN 0812234286.
- Thackray, Arnold; Sturchio, Jeffrey L.; Carroll, P. Thomas; Bud, Robert (1985). Chemistry in America 1876–1976 Historical Indicators. Springer Dordrecht. ISBN 978-9027726629.
- Morrell, Jack; Thackray, Arnold (1981). Gentlemen of science: early years of the British Association for the Advancement of Science (1st ed.). Oxford: Clarendon Pr.
- Thackray, Arnold (1974). "Natural Knowledge in Cultural Context: The Manchester Model". The American Historical Review. 79 (3): 672–709. doi:10.2307/1867893. ISSN 0002-8762. JSTOR 1867893.
- Thackray, Arnold (1972). John Dalton. Critical Assessments of his life and science. Cambridge Mass: Harvard University Press. ISBN 0674475259.
- Thackray, Arnold (1970). Atoms and Power. Harvard University Press. ISBN 978-0674052574. Italian translation Atomi e force (1981) Bologna
