= Carl B. Feldbaum =

American author (born 1944)

- Born: February 1, 1944 (age 82); Philadelphia, Pennsylvania
- Occupations: author, businessman and lawyer

Carl B. Feldbaum (born February 1, 1944, Philadelphia, Pennsylvania) is an American author, businessman and lawyer. He co-authored "Looking the Tiger in the Eye" which was awarded the Christopher Medal and was a New York Times Book of the Year in 1988.

From 1970 to 1973, Feldbaum served as Assistant District Attorney in Philadelphia. In 1973 he became an Assistant Special Prosecutor charged with investigating the Watergate scandal. He later served as Inspector General for Defense Intelligence in the Pentagon (1976-1979), Assistant to the Secretary of Energy (1979-1981), as President of Palomar Corporation (1981-1988), Chief of Staff to Senator Arlen Specter (1988-1993), and CEO of the Biotechnology Industry Organization (1993-2005).

He presently resides in Ketchum, Idaho and serves as Director on the boards of Actelion, Ltd., Exelixis, BioVentures for Global Health, and the Life Sciences Foundation.
