= Therapeutic discovery project =

The Qualifying Therapeutic Discovery Project Tax Credit was included in the Health Care Reform Bill to foster medical, life sciences, and biological innovation in the U.S. Many firms across the country could potentially be eligible for a Credit or Grant under this program. The Bill enables Treasury to allocate a maximum of $1 Billion in tax credits or grants to eligible companies. Treasury with guidance from Health & Human Services will accept, review, and certify applications. Potentially eligible companies should consult with their respective tax professionals to assess eligibility.

== Details of the project ==
- Limited to taxpayers with 250 or fewer employees (subject to controlled group rules);
- Credit amount is equal to 50% of the investment in "qualified therapeutic discovery projects";
- A "Qualified therapeutic discovery project" is defined as a project designed to:
  - treat or prevent diseases or conditions by conducting preclinical activities, clinical trials, or clinical studies, or carrying out research protocols, for the purpose of securing approval of a drug or biologic;
  - determine molecular factors related to diseases or conditions by developing molecular diagnostics to guide therapeutic decisions; or
  - develop processes, technologies, or products to further the delivery or administration of therapeutics.
- Treasury, in consultation with HHS, will award certifications for qualified investments eligible for credits allocated for tax years 2009 through 2010.
- Qualifying investments will include only expenditures incurred the during 2009 or 2010 tax years.
- The program expires by 31 December 2013 or the issuance of 1B in Credits/Grants, whichever comes first.
- Companies must apply to Treasury for certification
- NIH, in determining whether a project qualifies, will take into consideration only those projects that show reasonable potential to:
    - result in new therapies to treat areas of unmet medical need or to prevent, detect, or treat chronic or acute disease and conditions,
    - reduce long-term health care costs in the United States, or
    - significantly advance the goal of curing cancer within a 30-year period.
  - Approved NIH Projects will be submitted to Treasury for certification. In rendering its decision, Treasury will take into consideration projects that have the greatest potential–
    - to create and sustain (directly or indirectly) high quality, high-paying jobs in the United States, and
    - to advance US competitiveness.
- Eligible companies that are unable to utilize the Credits may elect to receive a Treasury Grant.
- Additional guidance may be found in Treasury Notice 2010–45;
- "Qualified therapeutic discovery project" expenditures will not qualify for the R&D credit, orphan drug credit, or bonus depreciation.
