= The Journal of Life Sciences =

- Editor-in-chief: William Patrick
- Frequency: Bimonthly
- Publisher: G. Steven Burrill; David Gollaher
- First issue: May 2007
- Company: Burrill & Company; California Healthcare Institute
- Country: USA
- Website: https://www.tjols.com/

The Journal of Life Sciences is a full-color bimonthly American magazine and daily website published in San Francisco since May 2007. Owned by Burrill & Company and the California Healthcare Institute, TJOLS reports on how developments in the life sciences affect society, business, and policy.

TJOLS was launched to cover topics "where science and society meet"—an area that its founders felt was often overlooked by peer-reviewed science journals and mainstream business publications. Printed in a digest format, TJOLS was designed to stand apart from other science magazines on the rack with illustrated covers and its reliance on photography to help tell stories. The magazine has been well received by biotechnology executives, policy wonks, and healthcare professionals.

From March 2007 to November 2007, TJOLS was published in partnership with Nielsen Business Media. Since that agreement ended in November 2007, the property has been owned jointly by Burrill & Company, a San Francisco-based life sciences merchant bank and the California Healthcare Institute, a public policy research and advocacy organization representing California's biotech community based in La Jolla, California.

== History ==
Longtime biotechnology investor G. Steven Burrill, CEO of life sciences merchant bank Burrill & Company, and David Gollaher, president of the California Healthcare Institute, a biotech trade group, first began efforts to develop TJOLS in 2006. The idea for the magazine was strongly influenced by The Acumen Journal of Life Sciences, a now-defunct publication that covered themes similar to TJOLS' and was published between 2003 and 2004. Burrill & Company and the California Healthcare Institute provided startup funding, along with members of the magazine's advisory board. A prototype was first published in November 2006, but the design and logo were scrapped in favor of TJOLS' current digest format and yellow-and-black logo.

In March 2007, Nielsen Business Media invested in TJOLS in a move to expand its media presence in the life sciences. The magazine was formally launched in May at BIO, the world's largest biotechnology conference held in 2007 in Boston. Five issues of the magazine, which is distributed free of charge to people who qualify, were printed in 2007. In November 2007, Nielsen ended its partnership with TJOLS.

The co-publishers of TJOLS are G. Steven Burrill, CEO of life sciences merchant bank Burrill & Company, and David Gollaher, president of the California Healthcare Institute, a biotech trade group. William Patrick, TJOLS' editor-in-chief, is the former science and medicine editor at Harvard University Press and is the co-author of a forthcoming book on the social neuroscience of loneliness Managing Editor Eric Wahlgren served on the staff of Red Herring and at Business Week Online. Web editor Daniel S. Levine, an award-winning business journalist, previously served as the biotechnology reporter for the San Francisco Business Times. He was also the founder of the online magazine Disgruntled (the business magazine for people who work for a living) and authored "Disgruntled: The Darker Side of the World of Work".

Under Patrick, the magazine has sought to make the content livelier than that of most science publications, with articles on human tissue as art, home kits for genetic testing, and research on the health effects of marriage by matchmaking site eHarmony's Ph.D.'s. Recent issue covers have focused on the big current trends in the life sciences including stem cell research, personalized medicine, and health and wellness.

TJOLS contributors have included Sally Lehrman, Frank Browning, Ann Parson, Gareth Cook, Bruce Goldman, Lawrence M. Fisher, Julian Smith, Brian Vastag, Stephan Herrera, Sarah A. Klein, and K.C. Swanson.
