= Science History Institute =

U.S. library, museum, and archive

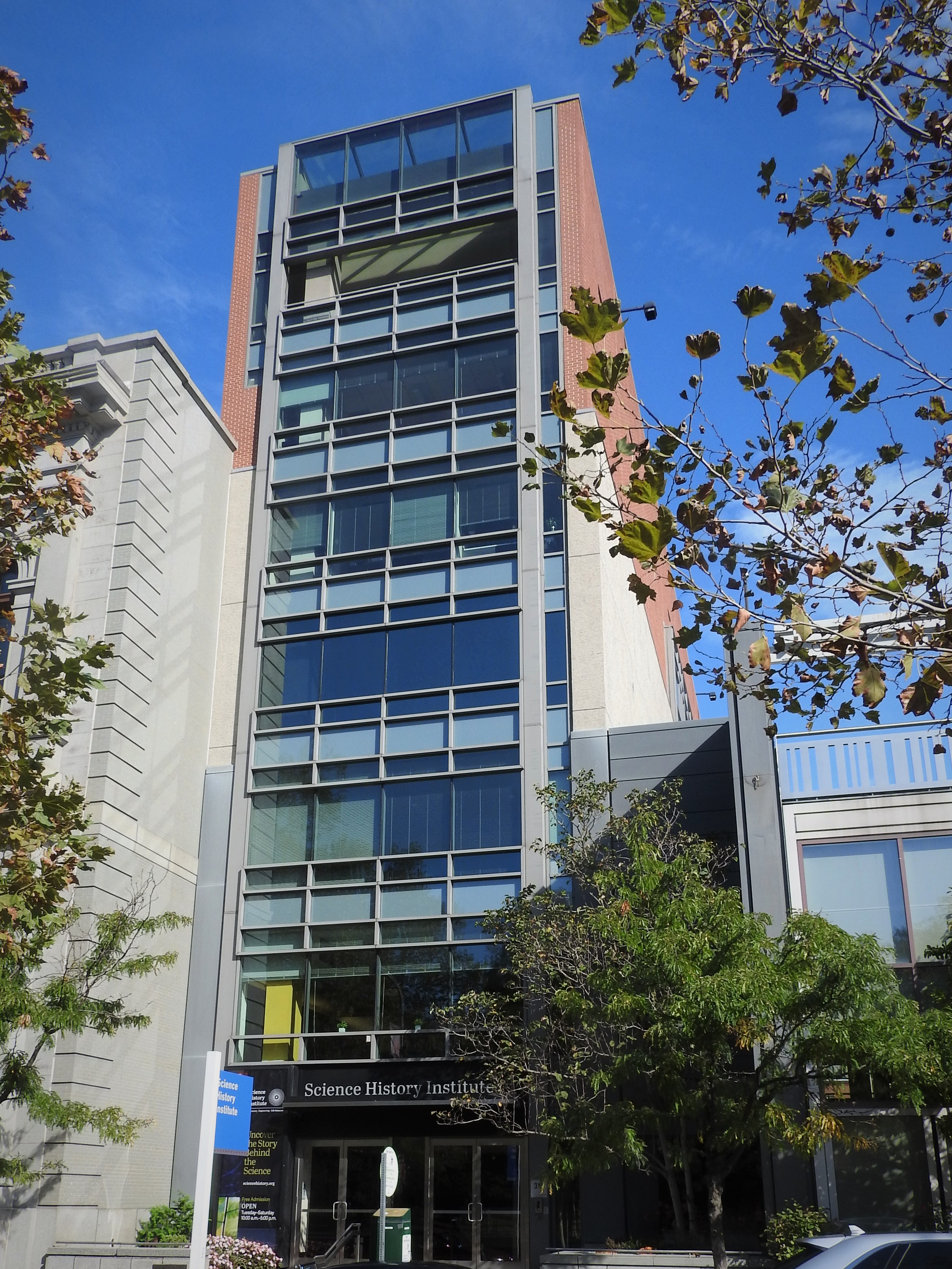
- The Science History Institute in Philadelphia in October 2019
- Former name: Center for the History of Chemistry (1982–1992); Chemical Heritage Foundation (1992 – February 1, 2018)
- Established: 22 January 1982
- Location: 315 Chestnut Street, Philadelphia, Pennsylvania, 19106, U.S.
- Key holdings: Alchemy, History of chemistry, History of science, Instrumentation
- Founder: Arnold Thackray
- President: David Allen Cole
- Public transit access: SEPTA bus: 21, 42, 57, Market–Frankford Line
- Website: www.sciencehistory.org

The Science History Institute is an institution that preserves and promotes understanding of the history of science. Located in Philadelphia, Pennsylvania, it includes a library, museum, archive, research center and conference center.

It was founded in 1982 as a joint venture of the American Chemical Society and the University of Pennsylvania, as the Center for the History of Chemistry (CHOC). The American Institute of Chemical Engineers (AIChE) became a co-founder in 1984. It was renamed the Chemical Heritage Foundation (CHF) in 1992, and moved two years later to the institution's current location, 315 Chestnut Street in Old City.

On December 1, 2015, CHF merged with the Life Sciences Foundation, creating an organization that covers "the history of the life sciences and biotechnology together with the history of the chemical sciences and engineering." As of February 1, 2018, the organization was renamed the Science History Institute, to reflect its wider range of historical interests, from chemical sciences and engineering to the life sciences and biotechnology.

The institute focuses on the history of chemistry, the history of science, the history of technology, trends in research and development, the impact of science on society, and relationships between science and art. It supports a community of research scholars and an oral history program. As of 2012, it was the largest U.S. grantor of research fellowships for the history of science.

== History ==
The idea of creating "a library of reference and a chemical museum" in the United States can be found in the Proceedings of the first meeting of the American Chemical Society (ACS) in 1876.

The idea of a Science History Institute dates to 1976, when the nation's bicentennial and the ACS' centennial stimulated interest in history and chemistry. As part of the ACS centennial activities, John H. Wotiz of its history-of-chemistry division organized a session on the history of chemistry; he was a strong proponent of a national center for historical chemistry.

=== Center for the History of Chemistry ===
In 1979, the ACS formed a task force chaired by Ned D. Heindel to look at creating a national center for the history of chemistry. Arnold Thackray, a professor in the Department of History and Sociology of Science at the University of Pennsylvania, and curator of the Edgar Fahs Smith Memorial Collection on the history of chemistry at the University of Pennsylvania, argued for the formation of such a center in Philadelphia. Thackray obtained promises of private support from chemist John C. Haas and institutional support from the Dow Chemical Company and DuPont. In December 1981, the ACS approved the establishment of the Center for the History of Chemistry, with support of $50,000 per year for five years, in cooperation with the University of Pennsylvania, which was to provide an equivalent in goods and services. An agreement to create the Center for the History of Chemistry was signed by officers of the American Chemical Society and the University of Pennsylvania on January 22 and 26, 1982. A policy council was appointed by the sponsoring institutions to oversee routine operations of the center, and Arnold Thackray was appointed part-time director of the center on April 29, 1982. The center was inaugurated on March 11, 1983, in several vacant basement rooms on the University of Pennsylvania campus. Its "immediate aims" included gathering oral histories of important chemists and inventorying papers and manuscripts in repositories throughout the country to map "the largely unexplored territory of the history of chemistry and chemical technology."

A National Advisory Board was also formed from a wide-ranging group of people in academia and industry. In 1982, its members included John C. Haas, historians Margaret W. Rossiter and Alfred D. Chandler, Jr. and at least three Nobel Prize winners, Christian B. Anfinsen, Herbert C. Brown, and Glenn T. Seaborg. The American Institute of Chemical Engineers (AIChE) became a co-founder of the center, signing an agreement on August 27 and 28, 1984. In addition, the institution began to establish relationships with affiliated organizations such as The Chemists' Club, the American Society for Biochemistry and Molecular Biology, the American Association of Textile Chemists and Colorists, the Electrochemical Society and the American Society for Mass Spectrometry.

As early as 1983, the Center for the History of Chemistry expressed an interest in "The Conservation of Historic American Chemical Instruments", in discussions of a possible joint project with the Smithsonian. However, the center did not yet have exhibition or collections space to allow for the acquisition of any but the most limited quantities of documents. The center did curate a number of traveling exhibitions by collaborating with other organizations, including "Joseph Priestley: Enlightened Chemist", "Polymers and People", "Scaling Up", and "Chemical Education in the United States".

==== Arnold and Mabel Beckman Center for the History of Chemistry (BCHOC) ====
During the 1980s, the center came to the attention of Arnold Orville Beckman. The Arnold and Mabel Beckman Foundation provided a $2 million challenge grant in 1986 to stimulate expansion of the center as a research institute, the Arnold and Mabel Beckman Center for the History of Chemistry (BCHOC). Beckman challenged the center to define its mission more broadly, reaching out to academic, professional and trade organizations, and including biochemistry, materials science, petrochemicals, pharmaceuticals and instrumentation within its mandate. The National Foundation for History of Chemistry was established in 1987 as a supporting Pennsylvania nonprofit. The renamed Beckman Center began a major capital campaign, listing as its needs "offices, an exhibit gallery, a reading room, library stacks, and archives and storage areas." It celebrated its inauguration on November 5, 1987. With support from the American Chemical Society's "Campaign for Chemistry", the center was able to move to 3401 Walnut Street, on the University of Pennsylvania campus, as of March 9, 1988.

==== Othmer Library of Chemical History ====
In 1989, the center received a further challenge grant, this time from Donald F. Othmer and his wife, Mildred Topp Othmer. Donald Othmer was a quiet chemical engineering professor from Polytechnic University in Brooklyn. The Othmers donated $5 million towards the creation of the Othmer Library of Chemical History. Again, efforts to match the grant were supported by the National Foundation for History of Chemistry and the American Chemical Society's Campaign for Chemistry. The new library was further supported by the donation of 8,500 monographs, textbooks and reference works from The Chemists' Club of New York.

=== Chemical Heritage Foundation ===
On July 1, 1992, the National Foundation for History of Chemistry changed its name to the Chemical Heritage Foundation, in recognition of the international nature of chemical history. By 1994, the organization was searching for a permanent home for the Beckman Center and Othmer Library. One candidate was the First National Bank building at 315 Chestnut Street, an 1866 masonry-and-brick structure with a two-story Palazzo facade. The institution bought the bank building and nearby property in 1995, in part with a matching grant from Donald Othmer. Soon afterward, its endowment was expanded by a bequest from Othmer's estate. The Chemical Heritage Foundation moved to 315 Chestnut Street on February 1, 1996. The buildings were renovated by Richard Conway Meyer over the next few years. Phase 1, providing temporary office space and book storage, was completed in 1998. Phase 2, a move to more permanent facilities, was completed in 2000. Phase 3, construction of the adjoining Ullyot conference space for meetings and events, began soon after.

==== Creating a public museum ====
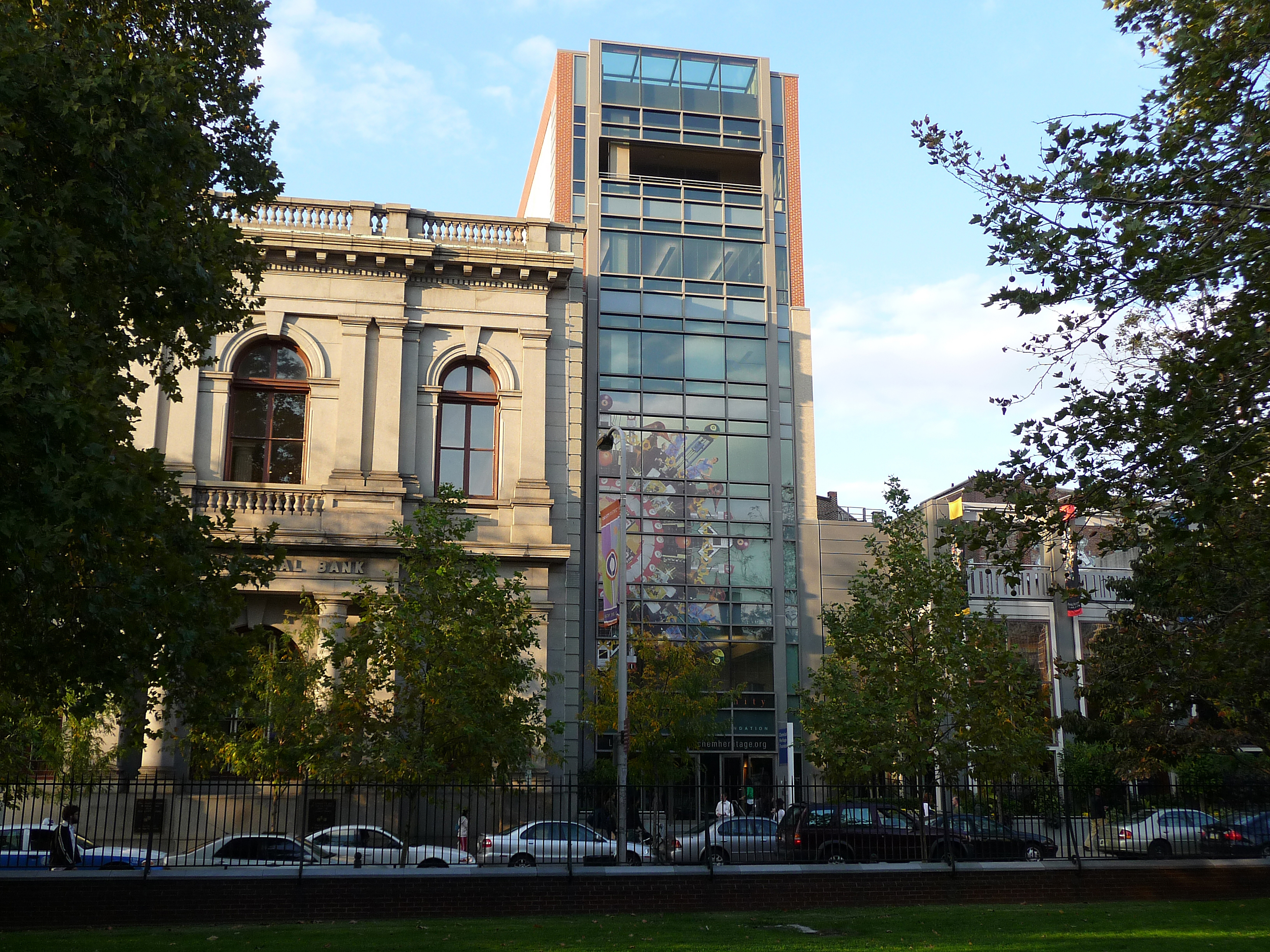
Chemical Heritage Foundation building

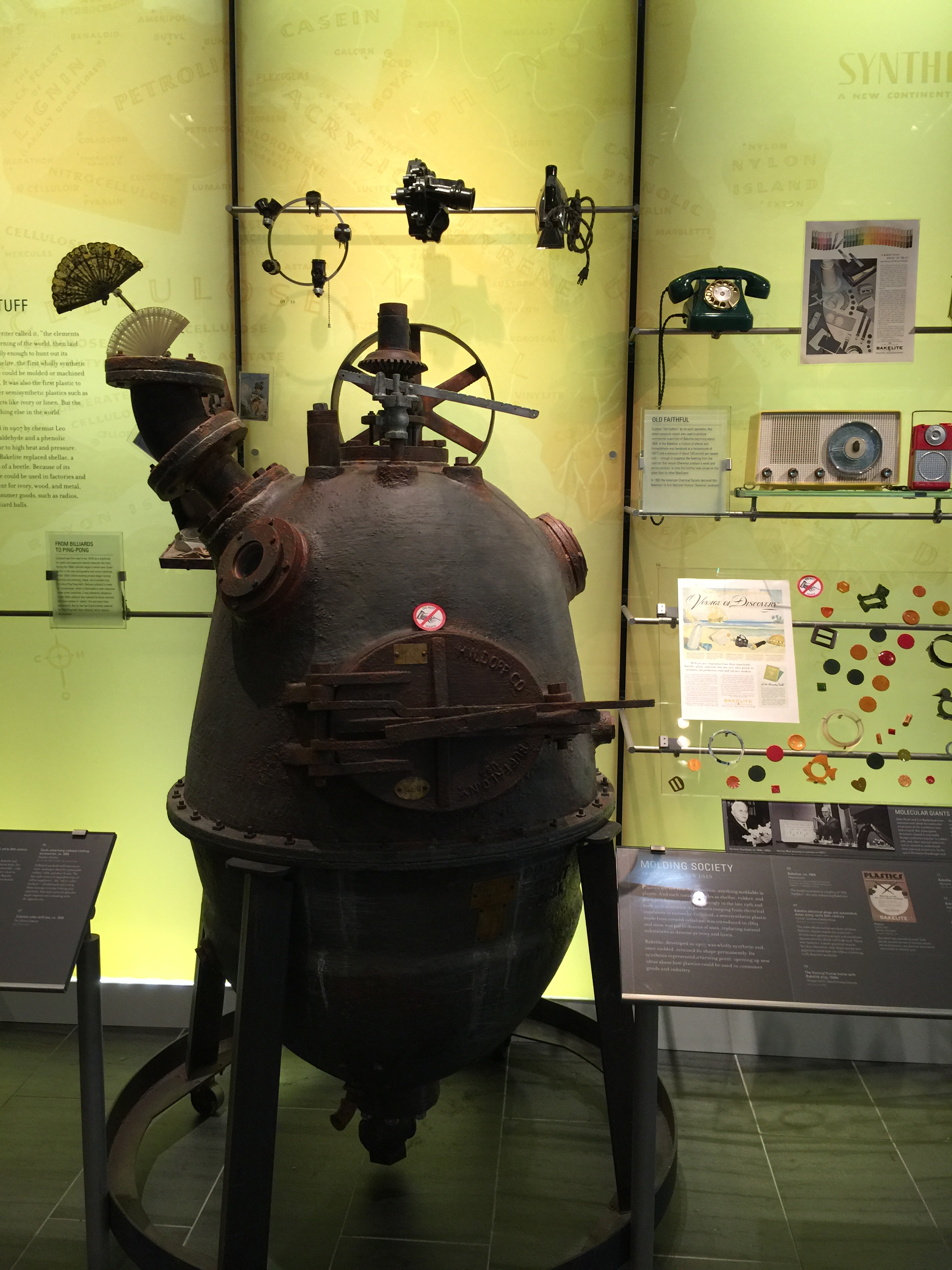
"Old Faithful" bakelite cooker model, in museum

Acquisition of a permanent building finally made it possible for the institution to develop "a public museum and display area". One possible focus was the history of instrumentation. As early as 1989, the Beckman Center had requested the loan or gift of Beckman Instruments such as the Beckman pH meter and the DU spectrophotometer for display at the center. Some of those instruments were included in an instrumentation exhibition organized by W. Richard Howe of the University of Pittsburgh for the Pittsburgh Conference on Analytical Chemistry and Applied Spectroscopy (PITTCON) in 1994, and expanded in 1999. In the early 1990s, inspired by John Ferraro, a committee was formed within the Society for Applied Spectroscopy (SAS), to pursue the creation of an instrumentation museum. Edward Brame and other members of that committee connected with Arnold Thackray and formed the nucleus of the institution's Chemical Instrumentation Museum Group (CIMG) in 1994. In 1997, on the recommendation of the CIMG, the Chemical Heritage Foundation's board approved a collections policy for the acquisition of "historically significant chemical instruments and apparatus". Instrumentation, however, was only one of several areas of interest as the institution began to expand its collections.

===== Alchemical collections =====
The Science History Institute is particularly interested in the origins of early science and chemistry. Its varied holdings have considerable depth both in alchemical books and fine-art depictions of early modern alchemists. The institution's collection of alchemy-related artwork, one of the largest in the world, builds upon two significant collections. Chester Garfield Fisher, founder of Fisher Scientific, started collecting alchemical art in the 1920s. In 2000, his collection of alchemical paintings was donated by Fisher Scientific International to the Chemical Heritage Foundation. In 2002, the institution received another gift from Roy Eddleman, founder of Spectrum Laboratories, whose collection contained paintings from the 17th, 18th, and 19th centuries. Together, the two collections contain more than 90 paintings and 200 works on paper illustrating the work of alchemists and their influence on the development of chemistry as a science.

===== Instrument collections =====
The Chemical Heritage Foundation's collections include such pioneering and landmark instruments as a 1934 Beckman Model G pH Meter, a DuPont 900 Differential Thermal Analyzer, an early custom Electro-spray Ionization Mass Spectrometer used by John B. Fenn, a 1947 Mettler B5 Single-Pan Balance, a 1963 Perkin-Elmer Model 125 Infrared Grating Spectrophotometer, and a c. 1980's Automated Peptide Synthesizer created by Bruce Merrifield.

The foundation expanded its instrument collections slowly, mostly through donations of single instruments or small groups of instruments. In 2000, the CIMG was transformed into the Heritage Council Instruments and Artifacts Committee (HCIAC), which included staff and supporters and began meeting under founding chair W. Richard Howe. In 2002, the institution was given hundreds of instruments by Stephen P. DeFalco, president of PerkinElmer, after the company closed a plant in Überlingen, Germany. An interim exhibition of Revolutionary Tools was curated at the Chemical Heritage Foundation by David Brock, showing fifteen 20th-century instruments, including Arnold Beckman's pH meter.

In 2004, a list of "50 Instruments That Changed the World" was identified as a basis for further expansion. In 2008, the institution released a list of its ten most wanted instruments.

===== The Arnold O. Beckman Permanent Exhibit and the Clifford C. Hach Gallery =====
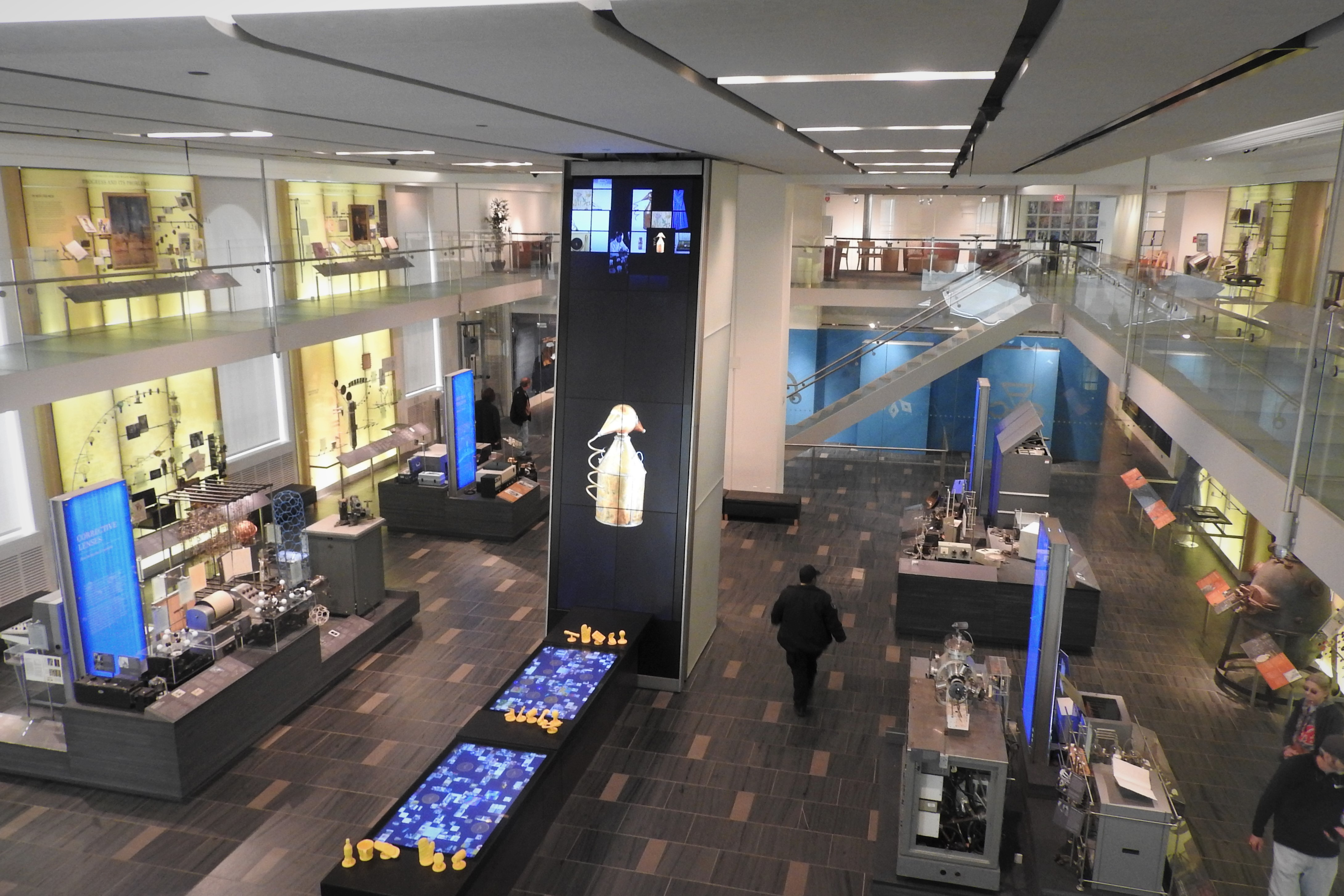
Exhibition gallery of the Science History Institute

As early as 1996, the Chemical Heritage Foundation had envisioned a broadly-based museum of chemical progress in which instruments would have "a major, but not exclusive role". That vision was followed when Peter Saylor of Dagit•Saylor Architects created the public museum and conference space. The Arnold O. Beckman Permanent Exhibit and the Clifford C. Hach Gallery for rotating exhibitions opened in 2008. The Arnold O. Beckman permanent exhibition, Making Modernity, was designed by Ralph Appelbaum Associates. It has been described as an "art gallery for science", and showcases objects from the institution's widely varying collections. "The instruments are only a fraction of the objects on display. The exhibition also includes books, documents, and artwork from CHF's collection, as well as an array of consumer products." The exhibition is organized around thematic arcs illustrative of the history of science, particularly chemistry. Displays include the influence of alchemy in early chemistry, the development of the first plastics, the development of brilliantly colored synthetic dyes, scientific advocacy for public health in the 19th and 20th centuries, and the teaching of chemistry through books and chemistry sets.

=== Science History Institute ===
On December 1, 2015, the Chemical Heritage Foundation merged with the Life Sciences Foundation, also founded by Arnold Thackray. Recognizing that the joint organization's interests extended beyond the field of chemistry, the organization began a two-year renaming process, whose outcome required the agreement of its founding partners, the American Chemical Society and the American Institute of Chemical Engineers. On February 1, 2018, the organization was renamed the Science History Institute, to reflect its wider range of historical interests, extending from the chemical sciences and engineering to the life sciences and biotechnology.

=== Leaders ===
Arnold Thackray, the institution's first president, was awarded the 1983 Dexter Award for his contributions to the history of chemistry. Thackray was succeeded by Thomas R. Tritton, under whose leadership (2008–2013) the history of science museum opened to the public in its present location, and the fellowship program expanded. Following a global search, Carsten Reinhardt, a professor of the history of science from Bielefeld University, Germany, was chosen in August 2013 as president and CEO of the organization. In 2016, Reinhardt returned to Germany, and his place was taken by interim president Robert G. W. Anderson. On January 11, 2017, it was announced that Anderson would take the job permanently. As of May 20, 2020, David Allen Cole, previously executive director of the Hagley Museum and Library, became president and CEO.

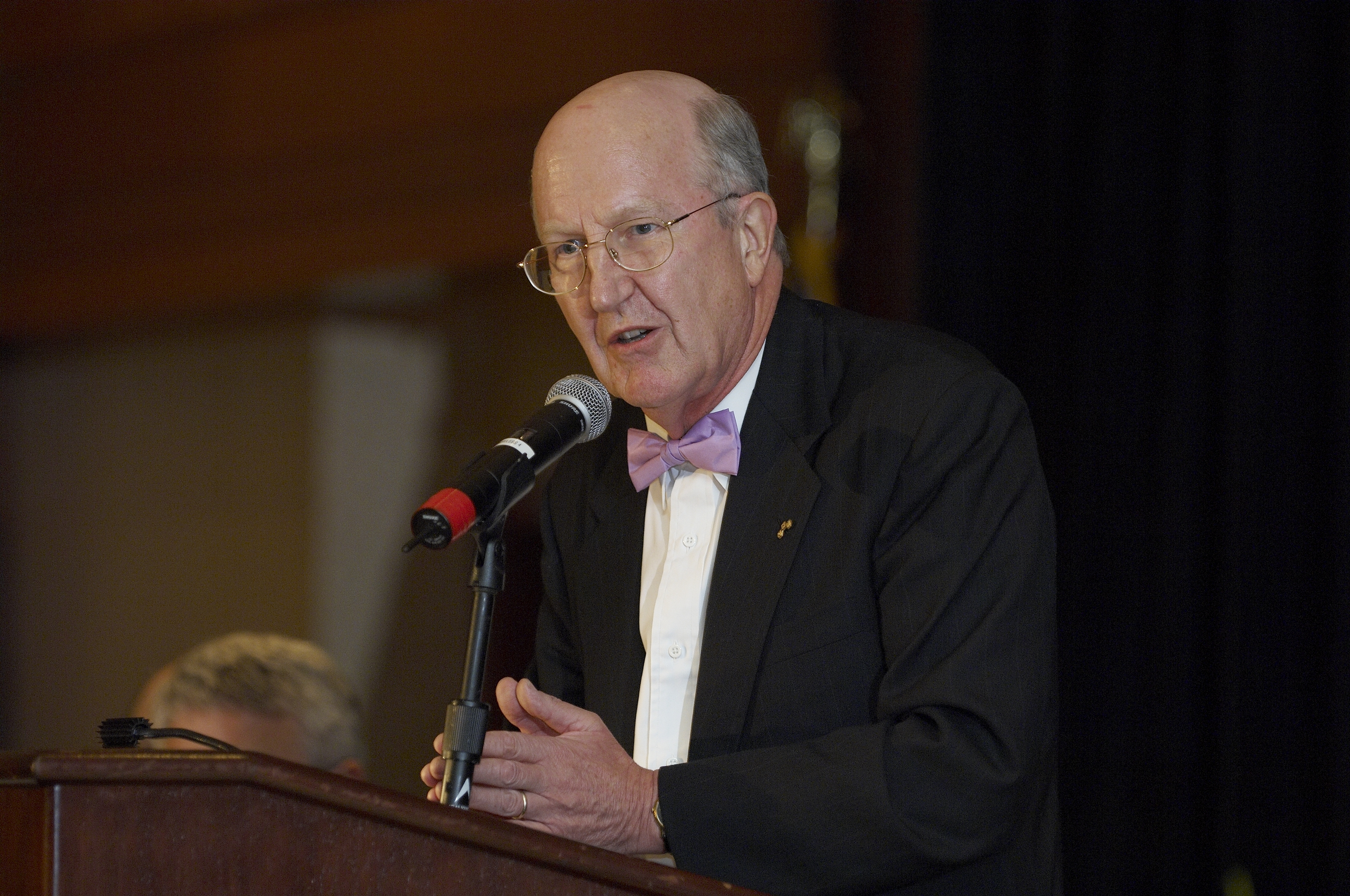
Arnold Thackray

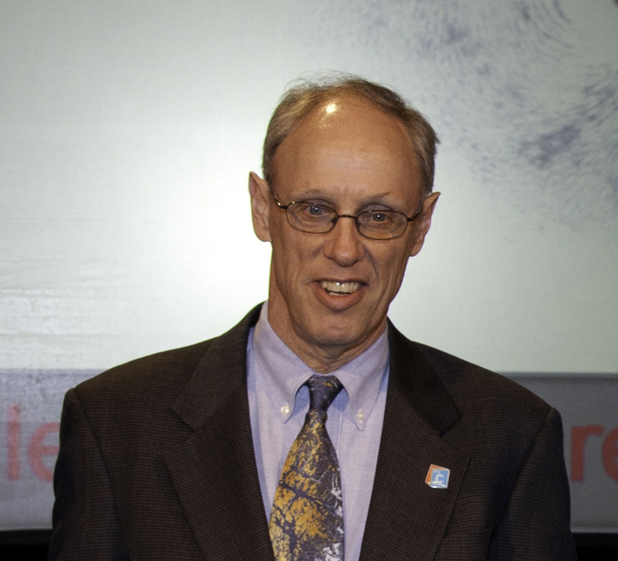
Tom Tritton

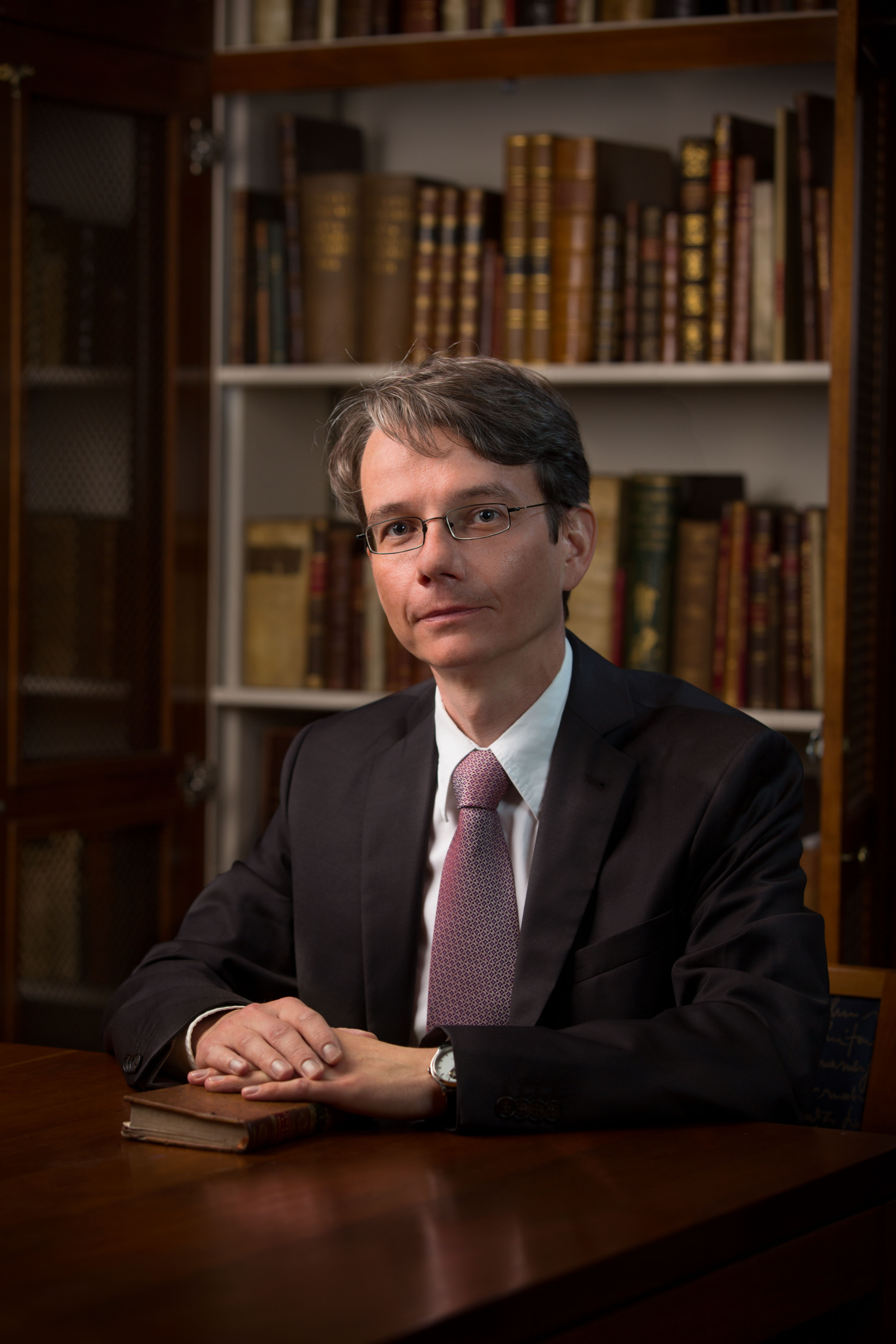
Carsten Reinhardt

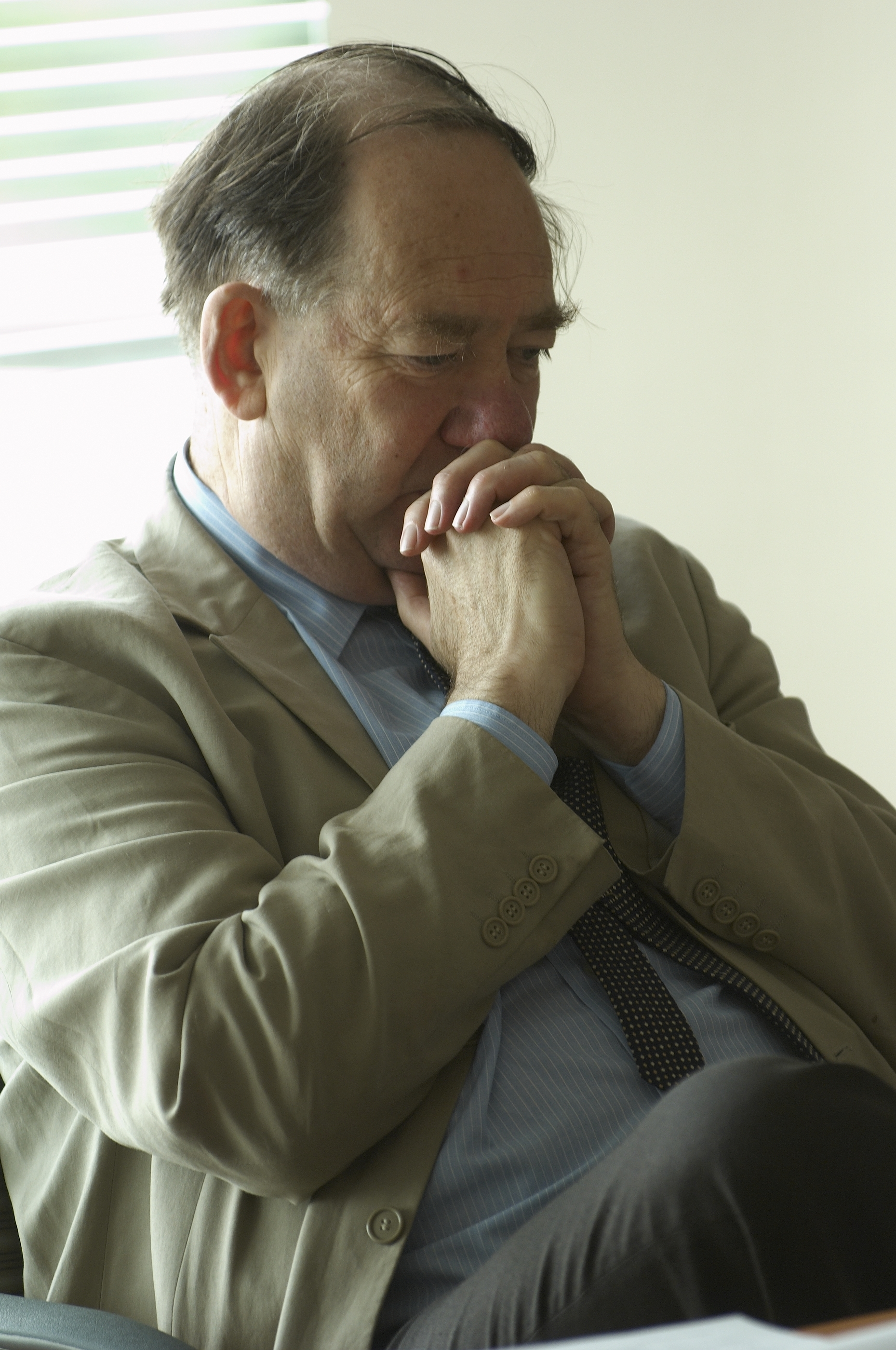
Robert Anderson

== Collections ==
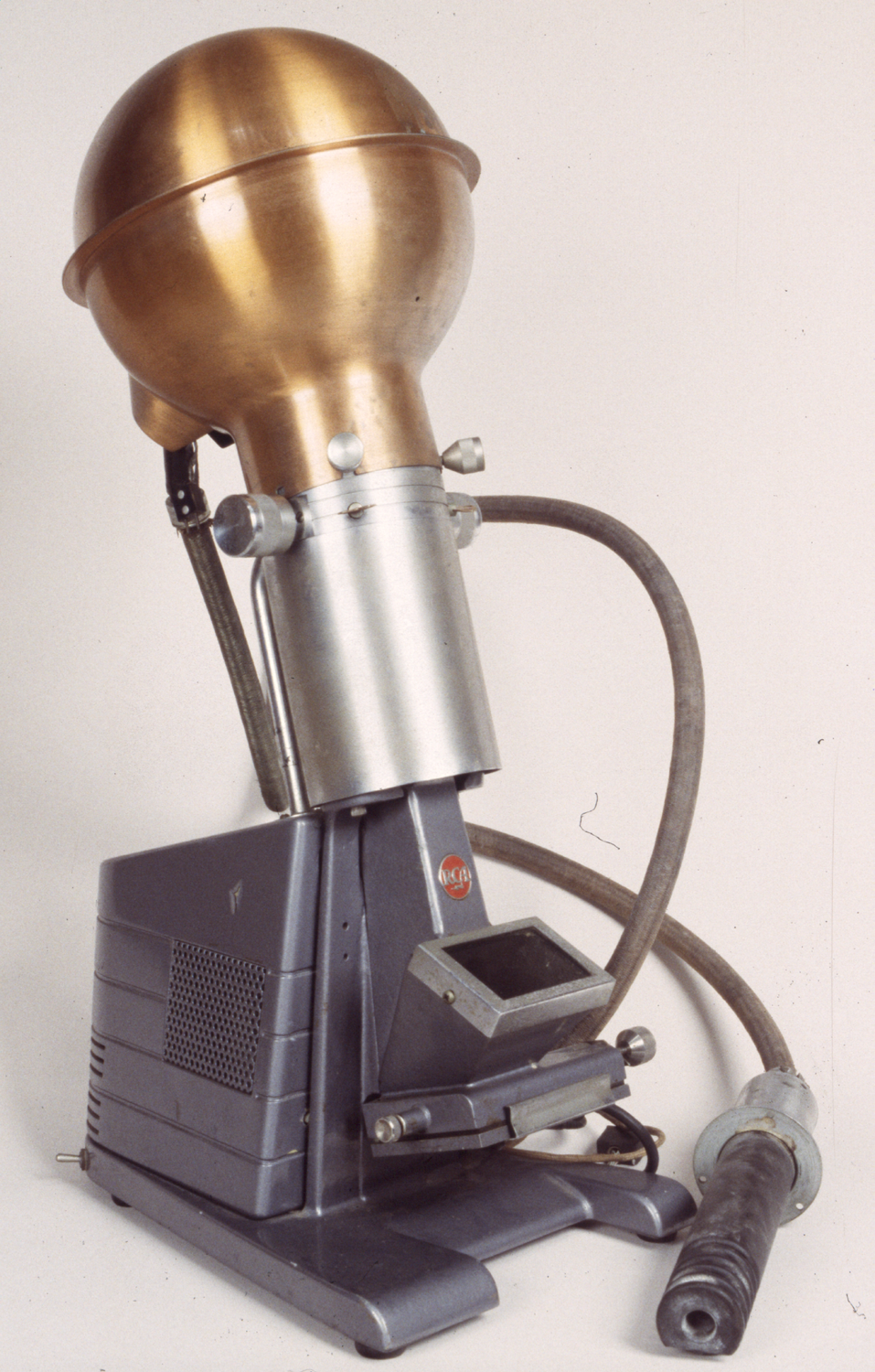
An RCA Model EMT3 Desktop electron microscope in 1950

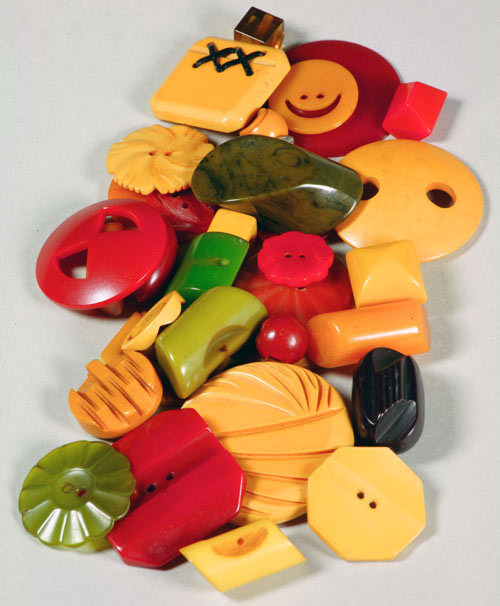
Catalin buttons

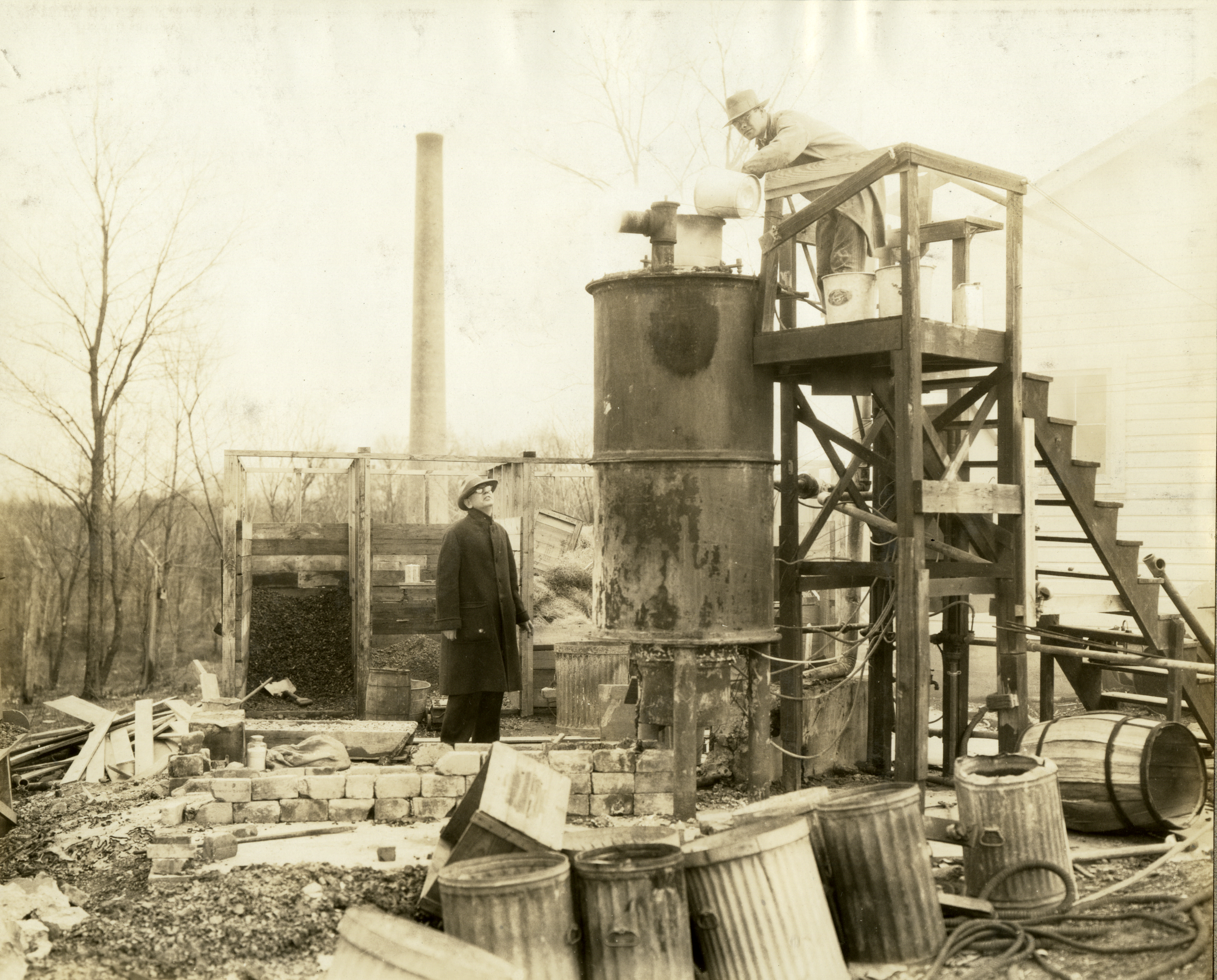
The experimental blast furnace at the Fixed Nitrogen Research Laboratory

The Science History Institute holds many collections relevant to the history of chemistry.

- The Othmer Library: In 2004, the Othmer Library became the steward of the Roy G. Neville Historical Chemical Library, which represents one of the most comprehensive single deposits of books on the history of chemistry in the world. Roughly 6,000 titles in all, the Neville collection comprises materials that date from the late 15th century to the early 20th century and includes many of the most important works in the history of science and technology from this period.
- Center for Oral History: The Center for Oral History at the Science History Institute aims to create a collection of comprehensive, professionally edited interviews with leading figures in chemistry and related fields.
- Archives: The Science History Institute collects, preserves, describes, and makes available the unique, unpublished materials that document the past 200 years of scientific history. The institute actively collects archival materials from outstanding scientists, industries, and professional organizations. Spanning over 5,000 linear shelf feet, these collections are a major attraction for scholars of the history of chemical and molecular sciences.
- Photographs: The Science History Institute's Image Archive contains an extensive collection of photographic prints, negatives, and slides reflecting the chemical history of the past century. The institute currently holds more than 20,000 images of notable chemists, laboratories, industrial scenes, historic gatherings, and chemical artifacts. These images hold considerable interest for scholars, journalists, and publishers who are active in chemistry-related fields. Informal snapshots and personal photos capture notable scientists at work and at play, such as the polymer chemists Wallace Carothers and Carl Shipp Marvel on a fishing trip and chemical engineer Donald Othmer and his wife on their wedding day. Highlights include:
  - Williams Haynes Portrait Collection: nearly 1,000 formal portraits of important chemists from the early 1900s
  - Travis Hignett Collection: images from the Fixed Nitrogen Research Laboratory (1920–1950)
  - Joseph Labovsky Collection: the history of nylon
  - Dow Historical Collection: 20th-century industrial images
- Fine Art: Strengths of the Science History Institute's fine-art collection include the Fisher Scientific International Collection and the Roy Eddleman Collection, more than 90 paintings and 200 works on paper that unmask the world of the alchemists. In their pursuit of the elusive philosophers' stone, alchemists created a body of knowledge about the material world through experiments and lab work, setting the stage for modern chemistry. Other highlights of the fine-art collection include oil paintings depicting such early modern chemical activities as distillation and metallurgy and watercolors showing the production process of the textile ramie.
- Artifacts: The Science History Institute collects three-dimensional artifacts to create a representative group of material-culture objects that can be used as resources for both research and exhibition. The institute holds a variety of historical artifacts related to chemistry and chemical education, including instrumentation. It has one of the best public collections of chemistry sets, with approximately 100 different sets from all over the world, including Australia and Germany. Other special artifact collections include The Beauty of Bakelite and Chemistry and Fashion. Highlights include the Beckman IR-1 spectrophotometer, John Fenn's electrospray mass spectrometer and Bruce Merrifield's solid-phase peptide synthesizer.
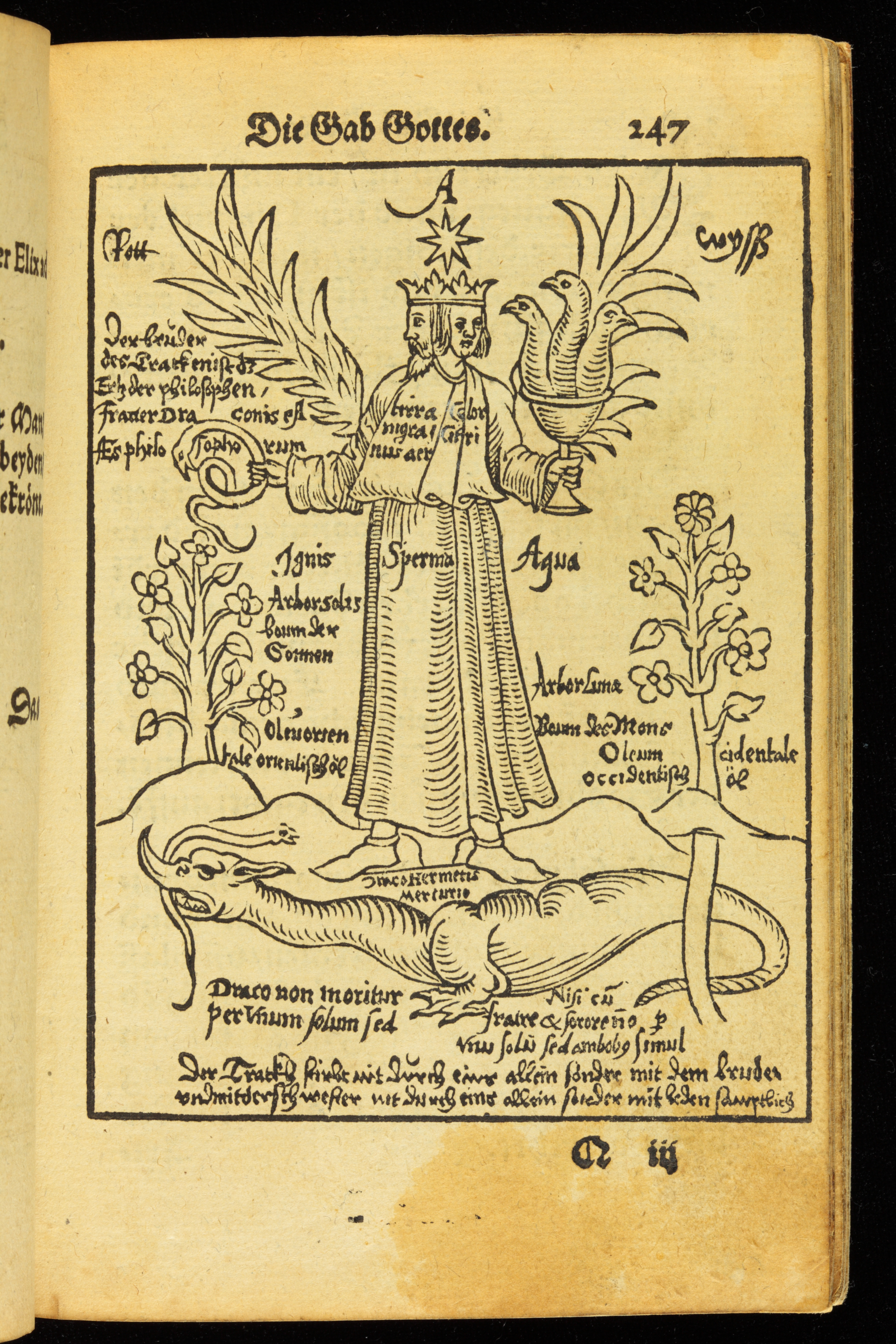
Pandora, das ist, Die edleste Gab Gottes, 1582

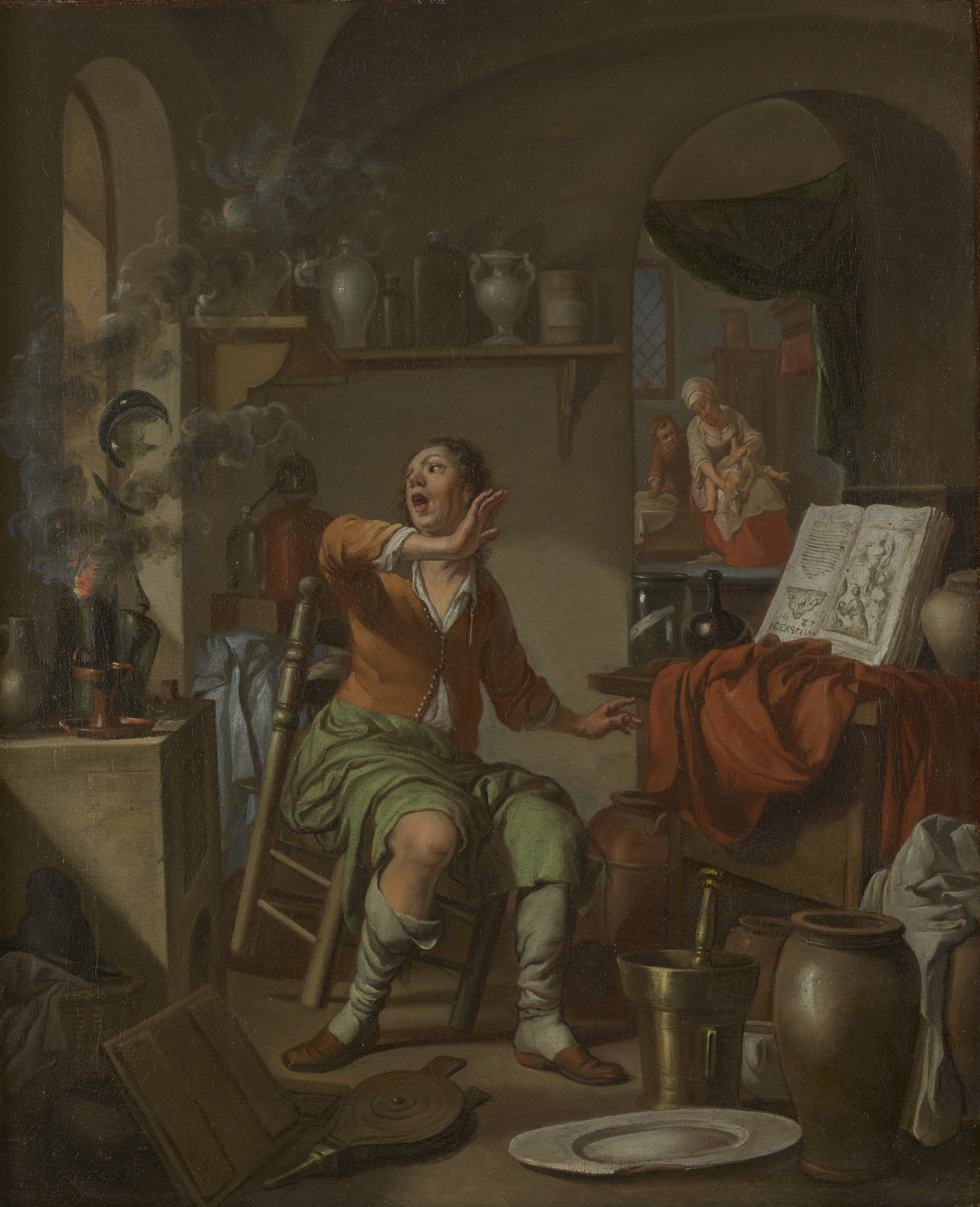
The Alchemist's Experiment Takes Fire, 1687

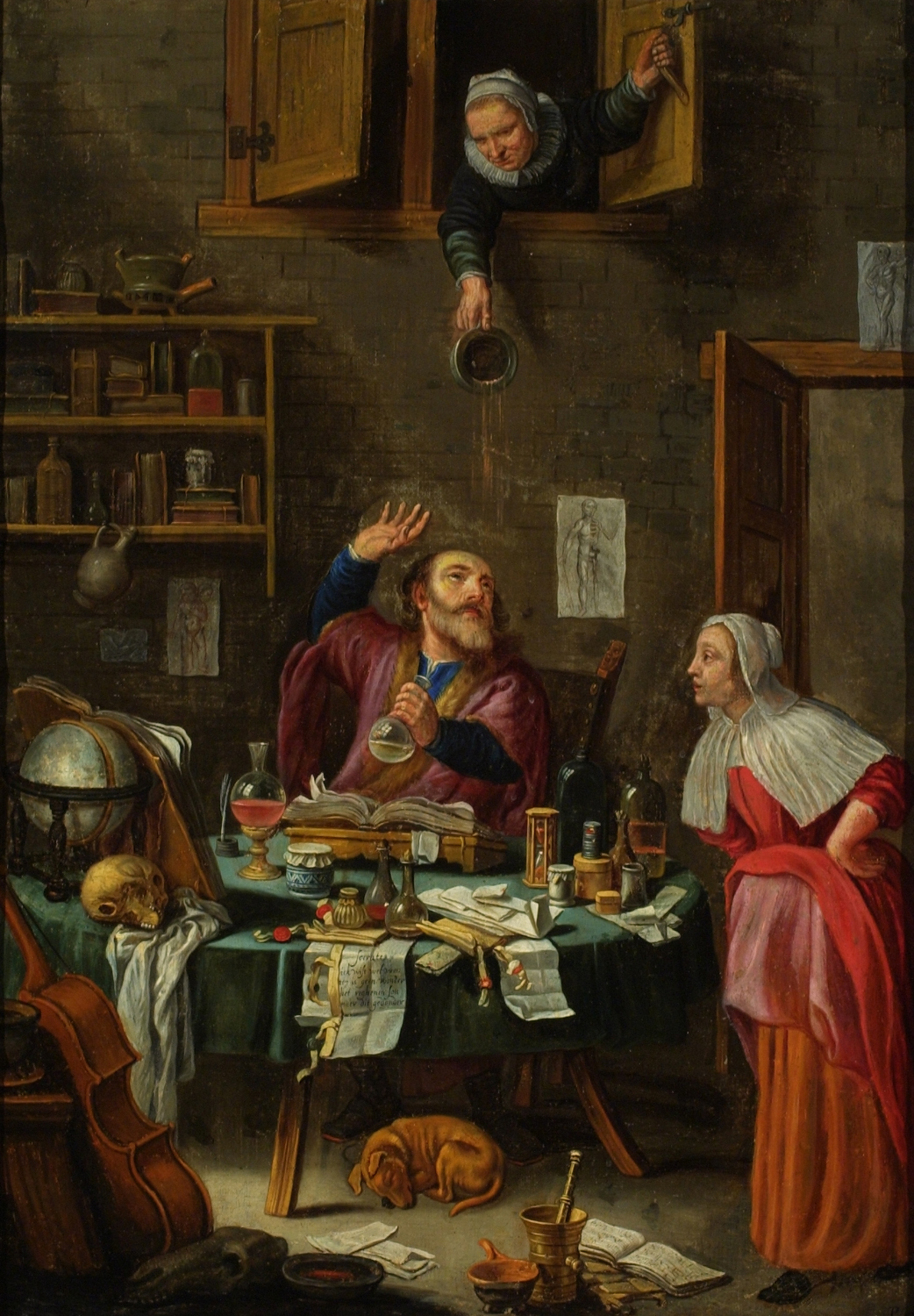
Trouble Comes to the Alchemist

== Distillations ==
The Science History Institute's magazine, Distillations, appeared in print three times a year until 2019, when content became digital-only. As an online resource, it continues to present stories about the history of science for a popular readership. Distillations first appeared in spring 2015, as a publication of the Chemical Heritage Foundation. It was predated by the Chemical Heritage Magazine, published as a quarterly by the Chemical Heritage Foundation.

== Fellowships ==
The Science History Institute offers many fellowships-in-residence, of varying lengths.

== Awards ==
The Science History Institute presents a number of annual awards to recognize outstanding contributions to science and technology by researchers, business leaders and entrepreneurs.

The annual Heritage Day Awards honor achievements in science and technology and comprise the Othmer Gold Medal, the Richard J. Bolte Sr. Award for Supporting Industries and, in conjunction with The Chemists' Club of New York, the Winthrop-Sears Medal.

The annual Affiliate Partnership Awards, presented in conjunction with affiliate organizations, recognize achievement with the Biotechnology Heritage Award, the Franklin-Lavoisier Prize, the Petrochemical Heritage Award and the Pittcon Heritage Award.

The Roy G. Neville Prize in Bibliography or Biography recognizes a biographical work in the field of chemical or molecular science. Established in 2006, the prize is awarded biennially.

== See also ==
- Burndy Library
- Harvard Collection of Historical Scientific Instruments
- Ullyot Public Affairs Lecture
- Whipple Museum of the History of Science
