= History of chromatography =

Chromatography is the passing of a mixture through an inert material to create separation of the solution components based on differential adsorption. The history of chromatography spans from the mid-19th century to the 21st. Chromatography, literally "color writing", was used and named around the year 1900, primarily for the separation of plant pigments such as chlorophyll (which is green) and carotenoids (which are orange and yellow). New forms of chromatography developed in the 1930s and 1940s made the technique useful for a wide range of separation processes and chemical analysis tasks, especially in biochemistry.

== Precursors ==
The earliest use of chromatography is sometimes attributed to German chemist Friedlieb Ferdinand Runge, who in 1855 described the use of paper to analyze dyes. Runge dropped spots of different inorganic chemicals onto circles of filter paper already impregnated with another chemical, and reactions between the different chemicals created unique color patterns. According to historical analysis of L. S. Ettre, however, Runge's work had "nothing to do with chromatography" (and instead should be considered a precursor of chemical spot tests such as the Schiff test).

In the 1860s, Christian Friedrich Schönbein and his student Friedrich Goppelsroeder published the first attempts to study the different rates at which different substances move through filter paper. Schönbein, who thought capillary action (rather than adsorption) was responsible for the movement, called the technique capillary analysis, and Goppelsroeder spent much of his career using capillary analysis to test the movement rates of a wide variety of substances. Unlike modern paper chromatography, capillary analysis used reservoirs of the substance being analyzed, creating overlapping zones of the solution components rather than separate points or bands.

Work on capillary analysis continued, but without much technical development, well into the 20th century. The first significant advances over Goppelsroeder's methods came with the work of Raphael E. Liesegang: in 1927, he placed filter strips in closed containers with atmospheres saturated by solvents, and in 1943 he began using discrete spots of sample adsorbed to filter paper, dipped in pure solvent to achieve separation. This method, essentially identical to modern paper chromatography, was published just before the independent—and far more influential—work of Archer Martin and his collaborators that inaugurated the widespread use of paper chromatography.

In 1897, the American chemist David Talbot Day (1859–1915), then serving with the U.S. Geological Survey, observed that crude petroleum generated bands of color as it seeped upwards through fine-grained clay or limestone. In 1900, he reported his findings at the First International Petroleum Congress in Paris, where they created a sensation.

== Tsvet and column chromatography ==
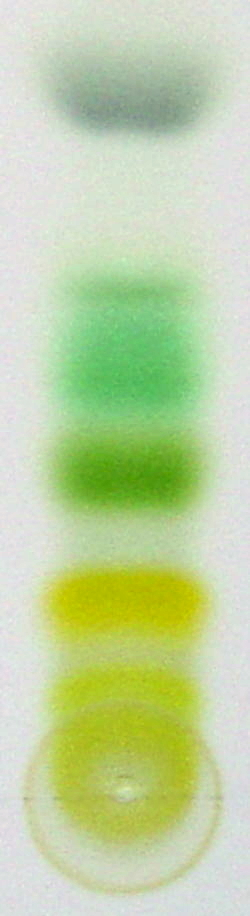
Thin layer chromatography is used to separate the colorful components of a plant extract

The first true chromatography is usually attributed to the Russian-Italian botanist Mikhail Tsvet. Tsvet applied his observations with filter paper extraction to the new methods of column fractionation that had been developed in the 1890s for separating the components of petroleum. He used a liquid-adsorption column containing calcium carbonate to separate yellow, orange, and green plant pigments (what are known today as xanthophylls, carotenes, and chlorophylls, respectively). The method was described on December 30, 1901, at the 11th Congress of Naturalists and Doctors (XI съезд естествоиспытателей и врачей) in Saint Petersburg. The first printed description was in 1903, in the Proceedings of the Warsaw Society of Naturalists, section of biology. He first used the term chromatography in print in 1906 in his two papers about chlorophyll in the German botanical journal, Berichte der Deutschen Botanischen Gesellschaft. In 1907 he demonstrated his chromatograph for the German Botanical Society. Mikhail's surname "Цвет" means "color" in Russian, so there is the possibility that his naming the procedure chromatography (literally "color writing") was a way that he could make sure that he, a commoner in Tsarist Russia, could be immortalized.

In a 1903 lecture (published in 1905), Tsvet also described using filter paper to approximate the properties of living plant fibers in his experiments on plant pigments—a precursor to paper chromatography. He found that he could extract some pigments (such as orange carotenes and yellow xanthophylls) from leaves with non-polar solvents, but others (such as chlorophyll) required polar solvents. He reasoned that chlorophyll was held to the plant tissue by adsorption, and that stronger solvents were necessary to overcome the adsorption. To test this, he applied dissolved pigments to filter paper, allowed the solvent to evaporate, then applied different solvents to see which could extract the pigments from the filter paper. He found the same pattern as from leaf extractions: carotene could be extracted from filter paper using non-polar solvents, but chlorophyll required polar solvents.

Tsvet's work saw little use until the 1930s.

== Martin and Synge and partition chromatography ==
Chromatography methods changed little after Tsvet's work until the explosion of mid-20th-century research in new techniques, particularly thanks to the work of Archer John Porter Martin and Richard Laurence Millington Synge. By "the marrying of two techniques, that of chromatography and that of countercurrent solvent extraction", Martin and Synge developed partition chromatography to separate chemicals with only slight differences in partition coefficients between two liquid solvents. Martin, who had previously been working in vitamin chemistry (including attempts to purify vitamin E), began collaborating with Synge in 1938, brought his experience with equipment design to Synge's project of separating amino acids. After unsuccessful experiments with complex countercurrent extraction machines and liquid-liquid chromatography methods where the liquids move in opposite directions, Martin hit on the idea of using silica gel in columns to hold water stationary while an organic solvent flows through the column. Martin and Synge demonstrated the potential of the methods by separating amino acids marked in the column by the addition of methyl red. In a series of publications beginning in 1941, they described increasingly powerful methods of separating amino acids and other organic chemicals.

In pursuit of better and easier methods of identifying the amino acid constituents of peptides, Martin and Synge also turned to other chromatography media. A short abstract in 1943 followed by a detailed article in 1944 described the use of filter paper as the stationary phase for performing chromatography on amino acids: paper chromatography. By 1947, Martin, Synge and their collaborators had applied this method (along with Fred Sanger's reagent for identifying N-terminal residues) to determine the pentapeptide sequence of Gramicidin S. These and related paper chromatography methods were also foundational to Fred Sanger's effort to determine the amino acid sequence of insulin.

Martin and Synge were awarded the 1952 Nobel Prize in Chemistry "for their invention of partition chromatography".

== Refining the techniques ==
The next development was gas chromatography (GC). Martin and Synge had predicted its principles in their 1941 paper. Erika Cremer laid the theoretical basis of GC in 1944. Austrian chemist Fritz Prior, under the direction of Erika Cremer, constructed in 1947 the first prototype of a gas chromatograph and achieved separating oxygen and carbon dioxide, in 1947 during his Ph.D. research.

Beginning in 1949, Martin and Anthony T. James worked on developing GC. At his 1952 Nobel lecture, Martin announced the successful separation of a wide variety of natural compounds by GC.

GC was quickly adopted since it is easy and efficient for separating organic chemicals, and new detection methods for analyzing the output were quickly developed. The thermal conductivity detector, described in 1954 by N. H. Ray, was the foundation for several other methods: the flame ionization detector by J. Harley, W. Nel, and V. Pretorius in 1958, and the electron capture detector by James Lovelock in 1958. Others introduced mass spectrometers to gas chromatography in the late 1950s.

The work of Martin and Synge also set the stage for high performance liquid chromatography (HPLC), suggesting that small sorbent particles and pressure could produce fast liquid chromatography techniques. This became widely practical by the late 1960s (and the method was used to separate amino acids as early as 1960).

== Thin layer chromatography ==
The first developments in thin layer chromatography occurred in the 1940s, and techniques advanced rapidly in the 1950s after the introduction of relatively large plates and relatively stable materials for sorbent layers.

== Later developments ==
In 1987 Pedro Cuatrecasas and Meir Wilchek were awarded the Wolf Prize in Medicine for the invention and development of affinity chromatography and its applications to biomedical sciences.

== Cited sources ==
- Martin, Archer J. P. (December 12, 1952). "The development of partition chromatography. Nobel Lecture" (PDF). Nobel Lectures, Chemistry 1942–1962. Amsterdam: Elsevier.
- Ettre, Leslie Stephen (2001). "The Predawn of Paper Chromatography". Chromatographia. 54 (5–6): 409–414. doi:10.1007/BF02492694. S2CID 95357195.
- Touchstone, Joseph C. (1993). "History of Chromatography". Journal of Liquid Chromatography. 16 (8): 1647–1665. doi:10.1080/10826079308021679.
