= Countercurrent chromatography =

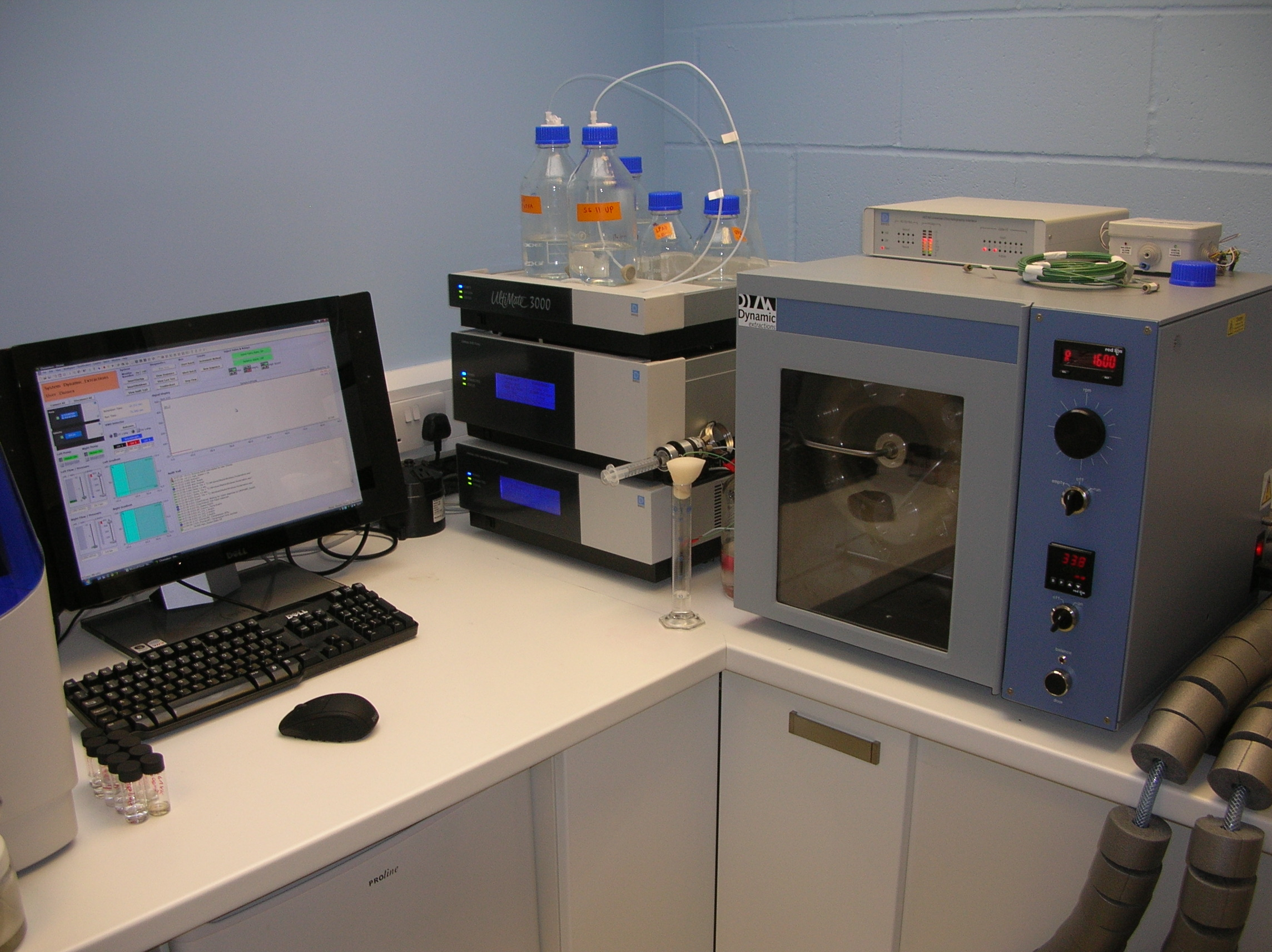
A high-performance countercurrent chromatography system

Countercurrent chromatography (CCC, also counter-current chromatography) is a form of liquid–liquid chromatography that uses a liquid stationary phase that is held in place by inertia of the molecules composing the stationary phase accelerating toward the center of a centrifuge due to centripetal force and is used to separate, identify, and quantify the chemical components of a mixture. In its broadest sense, countercurrent chromatography encompasses a collection of related liquid chromatography techniques that employ two immiscible liquid phases without a solid support. The two liquid phases come in contact with each other as at least one phase is pumped through a column, a hollow tube or a series of chambers connected with channels, which contains both phases. The resulting dynamic mixing and settling action allows the components to be separated by their respective solubilities in the two phases. A wide variety of two-phase solvent systems consisting of at least two immiscible liquids may be employed to provide the proper selectivity for the desired separation.

Some types of countercurrent chromatography, such as dual flow CCC, feature a true countercurrent process where the two immiscible phases flow past each other and exit at opposite ends of the column. More often, however, one liquid acts as the stationary phase and is retained in the column while the mobile phase is pumped through it. The liquid stationary phase is held in place by gravity or inertia of the molecules composing the stationary phase accelerating toward the center of a centrifuge due to centripetal force. An example of a gravity method is called droplet counter current chromatography (DCCC). There are two modes by which the stationary phase is retained by centripetal force: hydrostatic and hydrodynamic. In the hydrostatic method, the column is rotated about a central axis. Hydrostatic instruments are marketed under the name centrifugal partition chromatography (CPC). Hydrodynamic instruments are often marketed as high-speed or high-performance countercurrent chromatography (HSCCC and HPCCC respectively) instruments which rely on the Archimedes' screw force in a helical coil to retain the stationary phase in the column.

The components of a CCC system are similar to most liquid chromatography configurations, such as high-performance liquid chromatography (HPLC). One or more pumps deliver the phases to the column which is the CCC instrument itself. Samples are introduced into the column through a sample loop filled with an automated or manual syringe. The outflow is monitored with various detectors such as ultraviolet–visible spectroscopy or mass spectrometry. The operation of the pumps, CCC instrument, sample injection, and detection may be controlled manually or with a microprocessor.

== History ==
The predecessor of modern countercurrent chromatography theory and practice was countercurrent distribution (CCD). The theory of CCD was described in the 1930s by Randall and Longtin. Archer Martin and Richard Laurence Millington Synge developed the methodology further during the 1940s. Finally, Lyman C. Craig introduced the Craig countercurrent distribution apparatus in 1944 which made CCD practical for laboratory work. CCD was used to separate a wide variety of useful compounds for several decades.

== Support-free liquid chromatography ==
Standard column chromatography consists of a solid stationary phase and a liquid mobile phase, while gas chromatography (GC) uses a solid or liquid stationary phase on a solid support and a gaseous mobile phase. By contrast, in liquid-liquid chromatography, both the mobile and stationary phases are liquid. The contrast is, however, not as stark as it first appears. In reversed-phase chromatography, for example, the stationary phase can be regarded as a liquid which is immobilized by chemical bonding to a micro-porous silica solid support. In countercurrent chromatography centripetal or gravitational forces immobilize the stationary liquid layer. By eliminating solid supports, permanent adsorption of the analyte onto the column is avoided, and a high recovery of the analyte can be achieved. The countercurrent chromatography instrument is easily switched between normal phase chromatography and reversed-phase chromatography simply by changing the mobile and stationary phases. With column chromatography, the separation potential is limited by the commercially available stationary phase media and its particular characteristics. Nearly any pair of immiscible solutions can be used in countercurrent chromatography provided that the stationary phase can be successfully retained.

Solvent costs are also generally lower than for HPLC. In comparison to column chromatography, flows and total solvent usage can in most countercurrent chromatography separations may be reduced by half and even up to a tenth. Also, the cost of purchasing and disposing of stationary phase media is eliminated. Another advantage of countercurrent chromatography is that experiments conducted in the laboratory can be scaled to industrial volumes. When gas chromatography or HPLC is carried out with large volumes, resolution is lost due to issues with surface-to-volume ratios and flow dynamics; this is avoided when both phases are liquid.

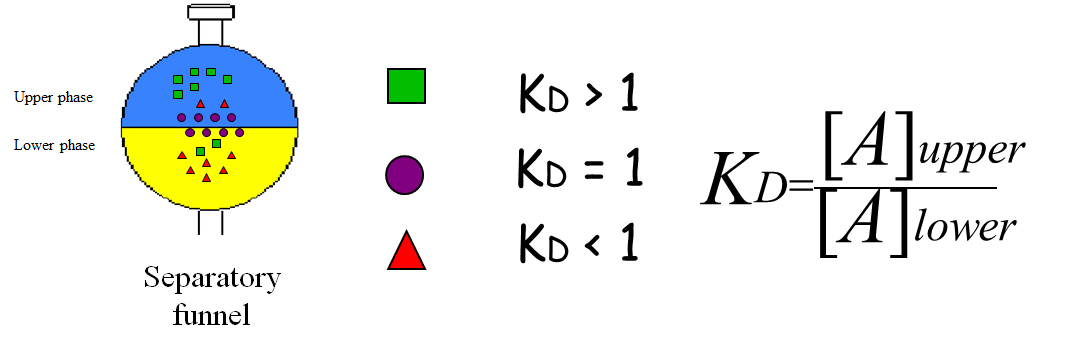
Partition coefficient (K_{D})

The CCC separation process can be thought of as occurring in three stages: mixing, settling, and separation of the two phases (although they often occur continuously). Vigorous mixing of the phases is critical in order to maximize the interfacial area between them and enhance mass transfer. The analyte will distribute between the phases according to its partition coefficient which is also called the distribution coefficient, distribution constant, or partition ratio and is represented by P, K, D, K_{c}, or K_{D}. The partition coefficient for an analyte in a particular biphasic solvent system is independent of the volume of the instrument, flow rate, stationary phase retention volume ratio and the g-force required to immobilize the stationary phase. The degree of stationary phase retention is a crucial parameter. Common factors that influence stationary phase retention are flow rate, solvent composition of the biphasic solvent system, and the g-force. The stationary phase retention is represented by the stationary phase volume retention ratio (Sf) which is the volume of the stationary phase divided by the total volume of the instrument. The settling time is a property of the solvent system and the sample matrix, both of which greatly influence stationary phase retention.

To most process chemists, the term "countercurrent" implies two immiscible liquids moving in opposing directions, as typically occurs in large centrifugal extractor units. With the exception of dual flow (see below) CCC, most countercurrent chromatography modes of operation have a stationary phase and a mobile phase. Even in this situation, countercurrent flows occur within the instrument column. Several researchers have proposed renaming both CCC & CPC to liquid-liquid chromatography, but others feel the term "countercurrent" itself is a misnomer.

Unlike column chromatography and HPLC, countercurrent chromatography operators can inject large volumes relative to column volume. Typically 5 to 10% of coil volume can be injected. In some cases this can be increased to as high as 15 to 20% of the coil volume. Typically, most modern commercial CCC and CPC can inject 5 to 40 g/L capacity. The range is so large, even for a specific instrument, let alone all instrument options, as the type of target, matrix and available biphasic solvent vary so much. Approximately 10 g/L would be a more typical value, that the majority of applications could use as a base value.

The countercurrent separation starts with choosing an appropriate biphasic solvent system for the desired separation. A wide array of biphasic solvent mixtures are available to the CCC practitioner including the combination n-hexane (or heptane), ethyl acetate, methanol and water in different proportions. This basic solvent system is sometimes referred to as the HEMWat solvent system. The choice of solvent system may be guided by perusal of the CCC literature. The familiar technique of thin layer chromatography may also be employed to determine an optimal solvent system. The organization of solvent systems into "families" has greatly facilitated the choice of solvent systems as well. A solvent system can be tested with a one-flask partitioning experiment. The measured partition coefficient from the partitioning experiment will indicate the elution behavior of the compound. Typically, it is desirable to choose a solvent system where the target compound(s) have a partition coefficient between 0.25 and 8. Historically, it was thought that no commercial countercurrent chromatograph could cope with the high viscosities of ionic liquids. However, modern instruments that can accommodate 30 to 70+ % ionic liquids (and potentially 100% ionic liquid, if both phases are suitably customized ionic liquids) have become available. Ionic liquids can be customized for polar / non-polar organic, achiral and chiral compounds, bio-molecule, and inorganic separations, as ionic liquids can be customized to have extraordinary solvency and specificity.

After the biphasic solvent system has been chosen a batch of is formulated and equilibrated in a separatory funnel. This step is called pre-equilibration of the solvent system. The two phases are separated. Then the column is filled with stationary with a pump. Next, the column is set an equilibration conditions, such as the desired rotation speed, and the mobile phase is pumped through the column. The mobile phase displaces the a portion of the stationary phase until column equilibration is achieved and the mobile phase elutes from the column. The sample may be introduced into the column at any time during the column equilibration step or after equilibration has been accomplished. After the volume of eluant surpasses the volume of the mobile phase in the column, the sample components will begin to elute. Compounds with a partition coefficient of unity will elute when one column volume of mobile phase has passed through the column since the time of injection. The compound can then be introduced to another stationary phase to help increase the resolution of results. The flow is stopped after the target compound(s) are eluted or the column is extruded by pumping the stationary phase through the column. An example of a major application of countercurrent chromatography is to take an extremely complex matrix such as a plant extract, perform the countercurrent chromatography separation with a carefully selected solvent system, and extrude the column to recover all of the sample. The original complex matrix will have been fractionated into discrete narrow polarity bands, which may then be assayed for chemical composition or bioactivity. Performing one or more countercurrent chromatography separations in conjunction with other chromatographic and non chromatographic techniques has the potential for rapid advances in compositional recognition of extremely complex matrices.

== Droplet CCC ==
Droplet countercurrent chromatography (DCCC) was introduced in 1970 by Tanimura, Pisano, Ito, and Bowman. DCCC uses only gravity to move the mobile phase through the stationary phase which is held in long vertical tubes connected in series. In the descending mode, droplets of the denser mobile phase and sample are allowed to fall through the columns of the lighter stationary phase using only gravity. If a less-dense mobile phase is used it will rise through the stationary phase; this is called ascending mode. The eluent from one column is transferred to another; the more columns that are used, the more theoretical plates can be achieved. DCCC enjoyed some success with natural product separations but was largely eclipsed by the rapid development of high-speed countercurrent chromatography. The main limitation of DCCC is that flow rates are low, and poor mixing is achieved for most binary solvent systems.

== Hydrodynamic CCC ==
The modern era of CCC began with the development of the planetary centrifuge by Dr. Yoichiro Ito which was first introduced in 1966 as a closed helical tube which was rotated on a "planetary" axis as is turned on a "sun" axis. A flow-through model was subsequently developed and the new technique was called countercurrent chromatography in 1970. The technique was further developed by employing test mixtures of DNP amino acids in a chloroform:glacial acetic acid:0.1 M aqueous hydrochloric acid (2:2:1 v/v) solvent system. Much development was needed to engineer the instrument so that required planetary motion could be sustained while the phases were being pumped through the coil(s). Parameters such as the relative rotation of the two axes (synchronous or non-synchronous), the direction of flow through the coil, and the rotor angles were investigated.

=== High-speed ===
By 1982 the technology was sufficiently advanced for the technique to be called "high-speed" countercurrent chromatography (HSCCC). Peter Carmeci initially commercialized the PC Inc. Ito Multilayer Coil Separator/Extractor which utilized a single bobbin (onto which the coil is wound) and a counterbalance, plus a set of "flying leads" which are tubing that connect the bobbins. Dr. Walter Conway & others later evolved the bobbin design such that multiple coils, even coils of different tubing sizes, could be placed on the single bobbin. Edward Chou later evolved and commercialized a triple bobbin design as the Pharmatech CCC which had a de-twist mechanism for leads between the three bobbins. The Quattro CCC released in 1993 further evolved the commercially available instruments by utilizing a novel mirror image, twin bobbin design that did not need the de-twist mechanism of the Pharmatech between the multiple bobbins, so could still accommodate multiple bobbins on the same instrument. Hydrodynamic CCC are now available with up to 4 coils per instrument. These coils can be in PTFE, PEEK, PVDF, or stainless steel tubing. The 2, 3 or 4 coils can all be of the same bore to facilitate "2D" CCC (see below). The coils may be connected in series to lengthen the coil and increase the capacity, or the coils may be linked in parallel so that 2, 3, or 4 separations may be done simultaneously. The coils can also be of different sizes, on one instrument, ranging from 1 to 6 mm on one instrument, thus allowing a single instrument to optimize from mg to kilos per day. More recently instrument derivatives have been offered with rotating seals for various hydrodynamic CCC designs, instead of flying leads, either as custom or standard options.

=== High-performance ===
The operating principle of CCC equipment requires a column consisting of a tube coiled around a bobbin. The bobbin is rotated in a double-axis gyratory motion (a cardioid), which causes a variable g-force to act on the column during each rotation. This motion causes the column to see one partitioning step per revolution and components of the sample separate in the column due to their partitioning coefficient between the two immiscible liquid phases. "High-performance" countercurrent chromatography (HPCCC) works in much the same way as HSCCC. A seven-year research and development process produced HPCCC instruments that generated 240 g's, compared to the 80 g's of the HSCCC machines. This increase in g-force and larger bore of the column has enabled a ten-fold increase in throughput, due to improved mobile phase flow rates and a higher stationary phase retention. Countercurrent chromatography is a preparative liquid chromatography technique, however with the advent of the higher-g HPCCC instruments it is now possible to operate instruments with sample loadings as low as a few milligrams, whereas in the past hundreds of milligrams had been necessary. Major application areas for this technique include natural product purification and drug development.

== Hydrostatic CCC ==
Hydrostatic CCC or centrifugal partition chromatography (CPC) was invented in the 1980s by the Japanese company Sanki Engineering Ltd, whose president was Kanichi Nunogaki. CPC has been extensively developed in France starting from the late 1990s. In France, they initially optimized the stacked disc concept initiated by Sanki. More recently, in France and UK, non-stacked disc CPC configurations have been developed with PTFE, stainless steel or titanium rotors. These have been designed to overcome possible leakages between the stacked discs of the original concept, and to allow steam cleaning for good manufacturing practice. The volumes ranging from a 100 ml to 12 liters are available in different rotor materials. The 25-liter rotor CPC has a titanium rotor. This technique is sometimes sold under the name "fast" CPC or "high-performance" CPC.

=== Realization ===
The centrifugal partition chromatograph instrument is constituted with a unique rotor which contains the column. This rotor rotates on its central axis (while HSCCC column rotates on its planetary axis and simultaneously rotates eccentrically about another solar axis). With less vibrations and noise, the CPC offers a typical rotation speed range from 500 to 2000 rpm. Contrary to hydrodynamic CCC, the rotation speed is not directly proportional to the retention volume ratio of the stationary phase. Like DCCC, CPC can be operated in either descending or ascending mode, where the direction is relative to the force generated by the rotor rather than gravity. A redesigned CPC column with larger chambers and channels has been named centrifugal partition extraction (CPE). In the CPE design, faster flow rates and increased column loading can be achieved.

=== Advantages ===
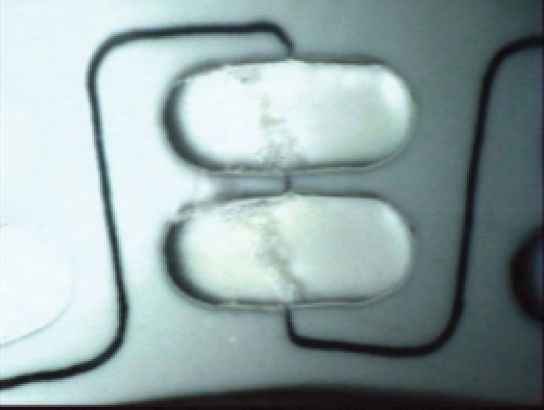
Visualization of mixing and settling in a CPC twin cell

CPC offers direct scale-up from analytical apparatuses (few milliliters) to industrial apparatuses (several liters) for fast batch-production. CPC seems particularly suited to accommodate aqueous two-phase solvent systems. Generally, CPC instruments can retain solvent systems that are not well-retained in a hydrodynamic instrument due to small differences in density between the phases. It has been very helpful for the development of CPC instrumentation to visualize the flow patterns which give rise to the mixing and settling in the CPC chamber with an asynchronous camera and a stroboscope triggered by the CPC rotor.

== Modes of operation ==
The aforementioned hydrodynamic and hydrostatic instruments may be employed in a variety of ways, or modes of operation, in order to address the particular separation needs of the scientist. Many modes of operation have been devised to take advantage of the strengths and potentialities of the countercurrent chromatography technique. Generally, the following modes may be performed with commercially available instruments.

=== Normal-phase ===
Normal phase elution is achieved by pumping the non-aqueous or phase of a biphasic solvent system through the column as the mobile phase, with a more polar stationary phase being retained in the column. The cause of original nomenclature of is relevant. As original stationary phases of paper chromatography were superseded by more efficient materials such as diatomaceous earths (natural micro-porous silica) and followed by modern silica gel, the thin-layer chromatography stationary phase was polar (hydroxy groups attached to silica) and maximum retention was achieved with non-polar solvents such as n-hexane. Progressively more polar eluents were then used to move polar compounds up the plate. Various alkane bonded phases were tried with C18 becoming the most popular. Alkane chains were chemically bonded to the silica, and a reversal of the elution trend occurred. Thus a polar stationary became "normal" phase chromatography, and the non-polar stationary phase chromatography became "reversed" phase chromatography.

=== Reversed-phase ===
In reversed-phase (e.g. aqueous mobile phase) elution, the aqueous phase is used as the mobile phase with a less polar stationary phase. In countercurrent chromatography the same solvent system may be used in either normal or reversed phase mode simply by switching the direction of mobile phase flow through the column.

=== Elution-extrusion ===
The extrusion of stationary phase from the column at the end of a separation experiment by stopping rotation and pumping solvent or gas through the column was used by CCC practitioners before the term EECCC was suggested. In elution-extrusion mode (EECCC), The mobile phase is extruded after a certain point by switching the phase being pumped into the system whilst maintaining rotation. For example, if the separation has been initiated with the aqueous phase as the mobile phase at a certain point the organic phase is pumped through the column which effectively pushes out both phases that are present in the column at the time of switching. The complete sample is eluted in the order of polarity (either normal or reversed) without loss of resolution by diffusion. It requires only one column volume of solvent phase and leaves the column full of fresh stationary phase for the subsequent separation.

=== Gradient ===
The use of a solvent gradient is very well developed in column chromatography but is less common in CCC. A solvent gradient is produced by increasing (or decreasing) the polarity of the mobile phase during the separation to achieve optimal resolution across a wider range of polarities. For example, a methanol-water mobile phase gradient may be employed using heptane as the stationary phase. This is not possible with all biphasic solvent systems, due to excessive loss of stationary phase created by disruption the equilibrium conditions within the column. Gradients may either be produced in steps, or continuously.

=== Dual-mode ===
In dual-mode, the mobile and stationary phases are reversed part way through the separation experiment. This requires changing the phase being pumped through the column as well as the direction of flow. Dual-mode operation is likely to elute the entire sample from the column but the order of elution is disrupted by switching the phase and direction of flow.

=== Dual-flow ===
Dual-flow, also known as dual, countercurrent chromatography occurs when both phases are flowing in opposite directions inside the column. Instruments are available for dual-flow operation for both Hydrodynamic and hydrostatic CCC. Dual-flow countercurrent chromatography was first described by Yoichiro Ito in 1985 for foam CCC where gas-liquid separations were performed. Liquid–liquid separations soon followed. The countercurrent chromatography instrument must be modified so that both ends of the column have both inlet and outlet capabilities. This mode may accommodate continuous or sequential separations with the sample being introduced in the middle of the column or between two bobbins in a hydrodynamic instrument. A technique called intermittent countercurrent extraction (ICcE) is a quasi-continuous method where the flow of the phases is alternated "intermittently" between normal and reversed-phase elution so that the stationary phase also alternates.

=== Recycling and Sequential ===
Recycling chromatography is mode practiced in both HPLC and CCC. In recycling chromatography, the target compounds are reintroduced into the column after they elute. Each pass through the column increases the number of theoretical plates the compounds experience and enhances chromatographic resolution. Direct recycling must be done with an isocratic solvent system. With this mode, the eluant can be selectively re-chromatographed on the same or a different column in order to facilitate the separation. This process of selective recycling has been termed a "heart-cut" and is especially effective in purifying selected target compounds with some sacrificial loss of recovery. The process of re-separating selected fractions from one chromatography experiment with another chromatographic method has long been practiced by scientists. Recycling and sequential chromatography is a streamlined version of this process. In CCC, the separation characteristics of the column may be modified simply by changing the composition of the biphasic solvent system.

=== Ion-exchange and pH-Zone-refining ===
In an conventional CCC experiment the biphasic solvent system is pre-equilibrated before the instrument is filled with the stationary phase and equilibrated with the mobile phase. An ion-exchange mode has been created by modifying both of the phases after pre-equilibration. Generally, an ionic displacer (or eluter) is added to mobile phase and an ionic retainer is added to the stationary phase. For example, the aqueous mobile phase may contain NaI as a displacer and the organic stationary phase may be modified with the quaternary ammonium salt called Aliquat 336 as a retainer. The mode known a pH-zone-refining is a type of ion-exchange mode that utilizes acids and/or bases as solvent modifiers. Typically, the analytes are eluted in an order determined by their pKa values. For example, 6 oxindole alkaloids were isolated from a 4.5g sample of Gelsemium elegans stem extract with a biphasic solvent system composed of hexane–ethyl acetate–methanol–water (3:7:1:9, v/v) where 10 mM triethylamine (TEA) was added to the upper organic stationary phase as a retainer and 10 mM hydrochloric acid (HCl) to the aqueous mobile phase as an eluter. Ion-exchange modes such as pH-zone-refining have tremendous potential because high sample loads can be achieved without sacrificing separation power. It works best with ionizable compounds such as nitrogen containing alkaloids or carboxylic acid containing fatty acids.

== Applications ==
Countercurrent chromatography and related liquid-liquid separation techniques have been used on both industrial and laboratory scale to purify a wide variety of chemical substances. Separation realizations include proteins, DNA, Cannabidiol (CBD) from Cannabis Sativa antibiotics, vitamins, natural products, pharmaceuticals, metal ions, pesticides, enantiomers, polyaromatic hydrocarbons from environmental samples, active enzymes, and carbon nanotubes. Countercurrent chromatography is known for its high dynamic range of scalability: milligram to kilogram quantities purified chemical components may be obtained with this technique. It also has the advantage of accommodating chemically complex samples with undissolved particulates.

== See also ==
- History of chromatography
- Supercritical fluid chromatography
