= Partition chromatography =

Specialized form of column chromatography

Partition chromatography is a specific form of column chromatography, specialized for separating analytes with only slight differences in partition coefficients between two liquid solvents. The solid phase in the chromatography column consists of particles coated with one liquid solvent, and the other liquid solvent acts as the eluent.

Its theory and practice was introduced through the work and publications of Archer Martin and Richard Laurence Millington Synge during the 1940s. They would later receive the 1952 Nobel Prize in Chemistry "for their invention of partition chromatography".

== Synopsis ==
The process of separating mixtures of chemical compounds by passing them through a column that contains a solid stationary phase that was eluted with a mobile phase (column chromatography) was well known at that time. Chromatographic separation was considered to occur by an adsorption process whereby compounds adhered to a solid media and were washed off the column with a solvent, mixture of solvents, or solvent gradient. In contrast, Martin and Synge developed and described a chromatographic separation process whereby compounds were partitioned between two liquid phases similar to the separatory funnel liquid-liquid separation dynamic. This was an important departure, both in theory and under equilibrium conditions.

Martin and Synge initially designed a sequential liquid-liquid extraction with serially connected glass vessels that functioned as separatory funnels. The seminal article presenting their early studies described a rather complicated instrument that partitioned amino acids between water and chloroform solvents. The process was termed "counter-current liquid-liquid extraction." Martin and Synge described the theory of this technique in reference to the continuous fractional distillation described by Randall and Longtin.

They deemed this approach too cumbersome, so they developed a new method. One solvent, such as water, is immobilized by absorption onto silica gel particles as the stationary phase. The other solvent, such as chloroform, is the mobile phase. They published this method in 1941. The article contains both the theory in terms of the partition coefficient of a compound, and application to the separation of amino acids on a water-impregnated silica column eluted with a water:chloroform:n-butanol mixture.

== Further development ==
Partition chromatography allowed further developments of column chromatography, and inspired new forms of chromatography such as countercurrent distribution, paper chromatography, and gas chromatography. Commercial counter-current distribution instruments were used for many important discoveries The introduction of paper chromatography was an important analytical technique which gave rise to thin-layer chromatography. Finally, gas-liquid chromatography, a fundamental technique in modern analytical chemistry, was described by Martin with coauthors A. T. James and G. Howard Smith in 1952.

The stationary phase can be changed to change the separation characteristics. By chemically bonding alkane functional groups to silica gel, we obtain reversed-phase chromatography.

In 1944, Lyman C. Craig accomplished the original goal of Martin and Synge: column chromatography with two free-flowing liquid phases.
