= List of instruments used in toxicology =

Instruments used specially in Toxicology are as follows:

== Instrument list ==
Instrument	Uses
Instruments used in Internal medicine	to help treat and diagnose the toxin clinically
Syringe and needles	aspiration and collection of blood for chemical analysis; administration of medicines
Catheter	used to collect urine for chemical analysis
Enema set	to passively evacuate the rectum of faeces; video link
Lumbar puncture needle	used for puncturing into the spine (or cisterns or fontanelles of a new born) for cerebro-spinal fluid aspiration or for injection drugs, specially anesthetics in spinal blocks, epidurals, etc.
Ryle's tube or Nasogastric tube	used for nasogastric suction of ingested toxins (or at times introduction of food or drugs). video link
Electrocardiography machine (ECG)	to read and trace the electrical activity of the heart; most toxins have an effect on the heart video link
Blood gas analyzer	used to analyze and quantify the amount of various toxic gases within blood like Carbon monoxide
Electroencephalography (EEG)	to read and trace the electrical activity of the brain; video link
Polymerase chain reaction (PCR) apparatus	video link
Ophthalmoscope	to note the intra-ocular signs or effects of toxins
Endoscope	to look inside the oesophagus, stomach, upper intestines, bile duct, larynx, trachea, bronchi-through the mouth; anal canal, rectum, colon- through anus; used mainly in Surgery or by surgical consultants
Ultracentrifuge	used to separate particles dispersed in a liquid according to their molecular mass and aid in recognition
Electrophoresis apparatus	used to detect and classify serum proteins or proteins from any other source. Also used for DNA separation.
Chemical laboratory apparatus	for Chemical tests
Chromatography:	One of the basic modern "chemical examination" of body fluids and viscera;video links for details
•Gas Chromatography or Gas Liquid Chromatography(GLC)	-do-
•Planar Chromatography	-do-
•Paper Chromatography	-do-
•Thin layer chromatography	-do-
•Affinity chromatography	-do-
•Ion exchange chromatography	-do-
•Size exclusion chromatography	-do-
•Countercurrent chromatography	-do-
•Countercurrent chromatography	-do-
Setup for Radioimmunoassay (RIA)	previously it was widely used to detect various things in bold fluids like proteins (natural, infective, those produced by the body in reaction to disease, cancer related), tumor markers, hormones, viruses (hepatitis, HIV, etc.), etc.
Setup for Enzyme linked immunosorbant assay (ELISA)	presently it is widely used to detect various things in bold fluids like proteins (natural, infective, those produced by the body in reaction to disease, cancer related), tumor markers, hormones, viruses (hepatitis, HIV, etc.), etc. It has replaced RIA
