= Centrifugal extractor =

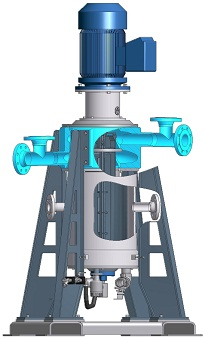
Fig 1. Centrifugal extractor

A centrifugal extractor—also known as a centrifugal contactor or annular centrifugal contactor—uses the rotation of the rotor inside a centrifuge to mix two immiscible liquids outside the rotor and to separate the liquids in the field of gravity inside the rotor. This way, a centrifugal extractor generates a continuous extraction from one liquid phase into another liquid phase.

A summary of contactor design principles and applications is included in a recent compilation.

== History ==
The first liquid-liquid centrifugal contactor was invented by Walter Podbielniak with the patent filed in 1932, then a series of developed models which were and continue to be used for whole variety of processes including solvent extraction of minerals and the purification of vegetable oils, but notably for the production of penicillin in World War II.

It has been employed in solvent extraction processes for metals valuable to the nuclear industry, for example as part of the Salt Waste Processing Facility at the Savannah River Site for implementation of the CSSX process to extract radioactive caesium from tank wastes stored there. Uses include recovery of valuable actinides in Spent Nuclear Fuel (SNF) reprocessing, specifically the recovery of fissile material.

It is also used in the processing of Waste Electrical and Electronic Equipment.

== Monostage centrifugal extractor ==
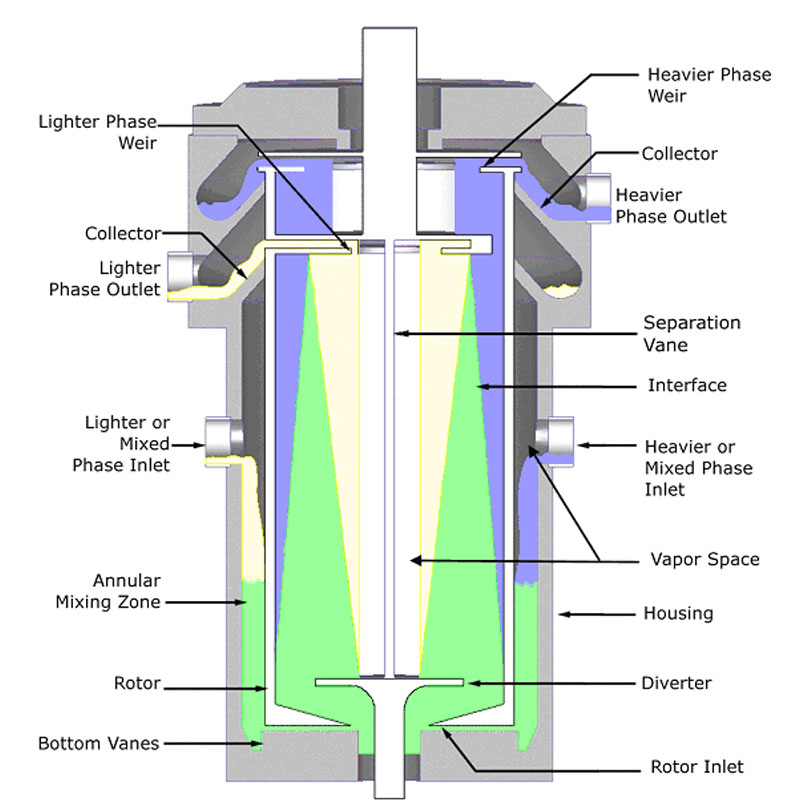
Fig 2. Cutaway view showing the flow path of the respective liquids

Two immiscible liquids of different densities are fed to the separate inlets and are rapidly mixed in the annular space between the spinning rotor and stationary housing. The mixed phases are directed toward the center of the rotor by radial vanes in the housing base. As the liquids enter the central opening of the rotor, they are accelerated toward the wall. The mixed phases are rapidly accelerated to rotor speed and separation begins as the liquids are displaced upward. A system of weirs at the top of the rotor allow each phase to exit the rotor where it lands in a collector ring and exits the stage. Flow from between stages is by gravity with no need for inter-stage pumps. The centrifugal contactors thus acts as a mixer, centrifuge and pump. Centrifugal contactors are typical referred to by the diameter of their rotor. Thus, a 5-inch centrifugal contactor is one having a 5-inch diameter rotor.

Annular centrifugal contactors are relatively low revolutions-per-minute (rpm), moderate gravity enhancing (100–2000 G) machines, and can therefore be powered by a direct drive, variable speed motor. Typical RPM for small units (2 cm) is approximately 3600RPM while larger units would operate at lower RPM depending on their size (typical speed for a 5-inch [12.5 cm] contactor is ~1800RPM). The effectiveness of a centrifugal separation can be easily described as proportional to the product of the force exerted in multiples of gravity (g) and the residence time in seconds or g-seconds. Achieving a particular g-seconds value in a liquid–liquid centrifuge can be obtained in two ways: increasing the multiples of gravity or increasing the residence time. Creating higher g-force values for a specific rotor diameter is a function of rpm only.

== Multistage centrifugal extractor ==
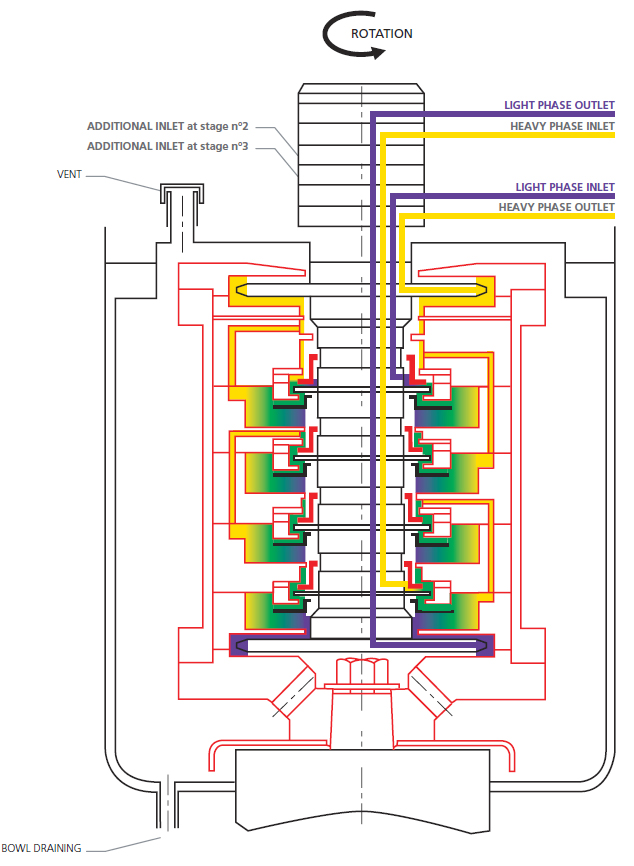
Fig 3. Multistage centrifugal extractor cross section drawing

The feed solution initially containing one or more solutes (heavy phase on the cross section drawing Fig 3.), and an immiscible solvent having a different density (light phase on cross section sketches) flow counter-currently through the extractor’s rotor, designed with a stack of mechanical subassemblies representing the required number of separate stages. The successive mixing and separation operations performed in each mechanical stage permit the mass transfer of the solutes from the feed solution to the solvent.

=== Each stage consists of ===
- Mixing chamber where the two phases are mixed and where the transfer of solutes to be extracted is achieved. A fixed disk allows the two phases to be mixed and to create an emulsion. It operates as a pump to draw the two phases from the preceding stage.
- Decantation chamber where the two previously mixed liquids are thoroughly separated by centrifugal force. Overflow weirs stabilize the separation area independently of flow rates. The interphase position depends on the diameter of the heavy phase overflow weir, which is interchangeable and to be selected according to the phase density ratio.

== Configurations ==
=== Mix and separation ===
As described above, the mix & separation configuration is the standard operation for centrifugal contactors used for liquid-liquid extraction processes. The two liquids (typically an aqueous phase (heavy) and an organic phase (light)) enter the annular mixing zone where a liquid-liquid dispersion is formed and extraction occurs as solutes (e.g. dissolved metal ions) are transferred from one phase into the other. Inside the rotor, the liquids will be separated into a heavy (blue) and a light (yellow) phase by their respective densities. This proportion of each phase (phase ratio), total flow rate, rotor speed, and weir sizes are varied to optimize separation efficiency. The separated liquids are discharged without pressure and flow by gravity to exit the stage (note that exit is higher than inlet in Fig. 2).

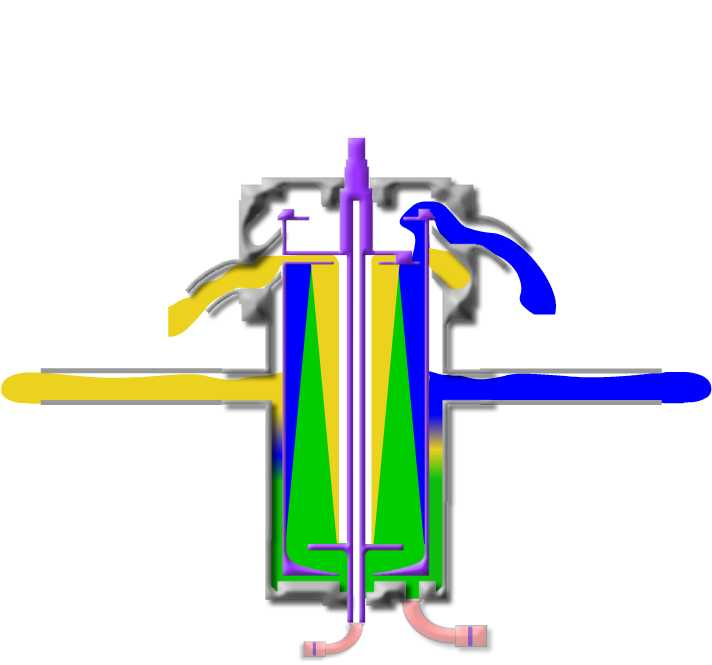
Fig 4. Mix and separation

=== Separation by direct feed ===
For applications requiring only separation of a pre-mixed dispersion (e.g. oil/water separation in environmental cleanup), the direct feed offers the option to feed the mixed liquid stream at a low sheer force directly into the rotor. Inside the rotor, the liquids will be separated into a heavy (blue) and a light (yellow) phase. This principle is used to optimize the separation efficiency. The separated liquids will be discharged without pressure.

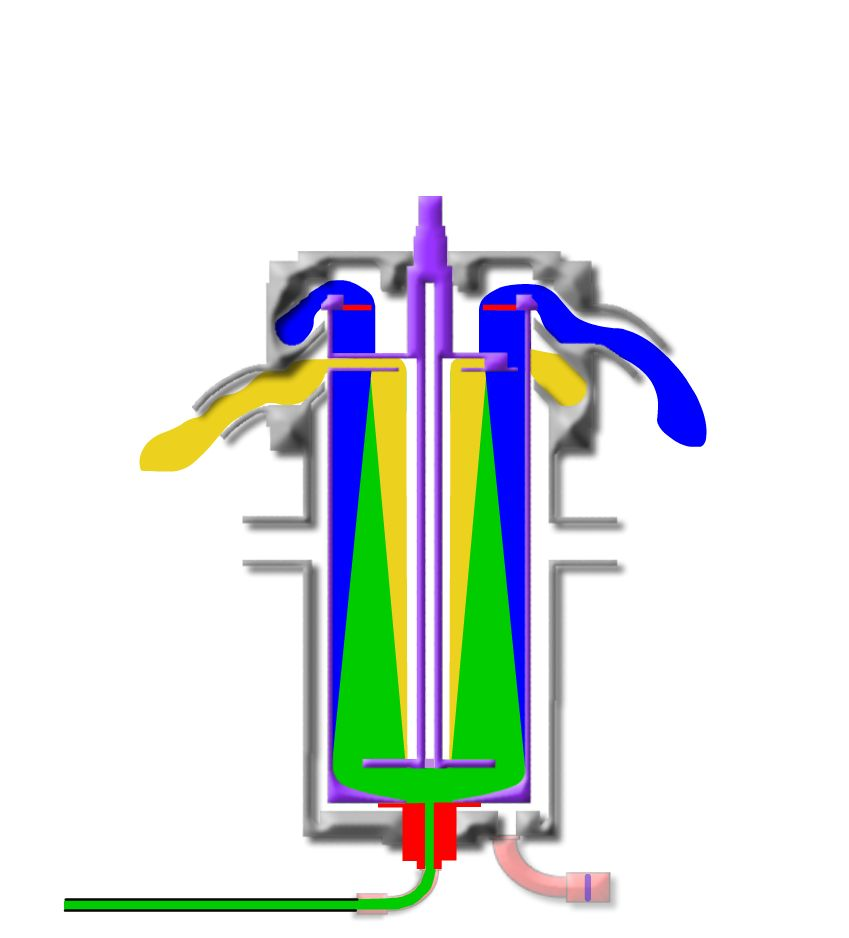
Fig 5. Separation direct feed

=== Multi-stage processing ===
Typically for solvent extraction processes in stage-wise equipment such as the centrifugal contactor, you would have multiple contactors in series for extraction, scrubbing, and stripping (and perhaps others). The number of stages needed in each section of the process would depend on process design requirements (necessary extraction factor). In the case in Fig. 6, four interconnected stages provide a continuous process in which the first stage is a decanting stage. The next two stages show a counter current extraction. The last stage is a neutralization as a cross stream interconnection.

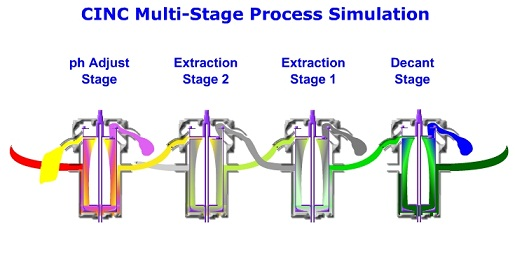
Fig 6. Multi-stage process

== See also ==
- Radial chromatography
