= L. S. Ettre =

Hungarian academic (1922–2010)

Leslie Stephen Ettre (September 16, 1922 – June 1, 2010) was a Hungarian-American analytical chemist and scientist who was known for his contributions to the field of chromatography, in particular open-tubular gas chromatography, as well as to documentation of the history of chromatography.

== Life ==
Ettre was born in Szombathely, Hungary and received a degree equivalent to a Masters of Science in Chemical Engineering in 1946 from the Technical University, Budapest. He later received a technical doctorate (Tech.) from the same institution. He and his wife, Kitty (Polonyi) Ettre (192?–199?) immigrated to the United States in 1958. They had one daughter.

== Work ==
From 1946 through 1956 Ettre worked at pharmaceutical and chemical engineering firms in Hungary. In 1956 he was appointed to the position of head of the Industrial Department of the Hungarian Research Institute on Plastics in Budapest. He held the position of chemical engineer at Lurgi AG in Frankfurt am Main, West Germany, where he began to work with gas chromatography. In the United States, Ettre worked at the PerkinElmer Corporation from 1958 until his retirement in 1990; he held the positions of Application Engineer, Product Specialist, Chief Applications Chemist, and Senior Staff Scientist, and finally Senior Scientist.

Ettre's major research area was chromatography. His activities covered a variety of fields including surface area studies, trace analysis, detector response, reaction gas chromatography, the retention index system, headspace gas chromatography, and in particular the theory and practice of open-tubular (capillary) column gas chromatography. After his retirement, he focused on the history and evolution of chromatography and its relationship to other scientific disciplines.

The history and variations of Hungarian philately in the period 1900–1944 was one of his lesser-known activities, in which he authored several monographs published by the Society for Hungarian Philately.

== Academia ==
Ettre was a senior lecturer and adjunct professor at several universities; Veszprém University, Budapest, Hungary (1950–1952), the University of Houston, Texas, United States (1986–1968), Johannes Kepler University, Linz Austria, and the Department of Chemical Engineering at Yale University, New Haven, Connecticut, United States (1977–1978, 1988–200?), where he was adjunct professor and research affiliate.

Ettre served as an editor of Chromatographia from 1970 – 1994, when he became a member of the journal's advisory board. He served on the editorial advisory boards of the Journal of Chromatographic Science (1963–1994) and the Journal of Liquid Chromatography (1984–1993), and on the editorial advisory boards of LC/GC Magazine in both the North America and Europe editions, as well as of the Magyar Kemikusok Lapja (Hungarian Chemical Journal). He was the author of the column “Milestones in Chromatography,” in LC/GC Magazine from 1999 until 2008.

Ettre was a member of the Commission on Analytical Nomenclature of the International Union of Pure and Applied Chemistry (I.U.P.A.C.) from 1982 to 1990, where he was responsible for the development of the "Unified Nomenclature for Chromatography" issued in 1993. He also served as a member of the executive committee of the American Society for Testing and Materials (A.S.T.M.) Committee E-19 on Chromatography (1966–1973); as a foreign member of the executive committee of the (British) Chromatographic Society (1992–1997); and as an executive committee member of the Chromatography Subdivision of the Division of Analytical Chemistry of the American Chemical Society (A.C.S.).

== Leslie Ettre Award ==
In 2008, the Leslie Ettre Award of the International Symposium on Capillary Chromatography was established by the PerkinElmer Corporation. The award is given each year to a scientist, 35 years old or younger, for the most interesting original research in capillary gas chromatography in environmental and food safety.

== Publications ==
Ettre authored and co-authored close to 300 scientific publications, 20 books, editor and co-editor of 42 books. He was a member of many professional chemical societies. From 1968 to 1974 he served as the Executive Editor of the Encyclopedia of Industrial Chemical Analysis.

=== Selected publications ===
- Foster Dee Snell, Clifford L Hilton, Leslie S Ettre, Encyclopedia of Industrial Chemical Analysis (John Wiley & Sons, 1966–1974), 20 volume set.
- L.S. Ettre and J.E. Purcell, Advances in Chromatography, Vol. 10, J.C. Giddings and R.A. Keller, Eds. (M. Dekker, Inc., New York, 1974)
- L. S. Ettre, "Farewell to 'Milestones in Chromatography'," LC/GC North America April, 2008.
- Leslie S. Ettre; Albert Zlatkis (2011). 75 Years of Chromatography: A Historical Dialogue. Elsevier. ISBN 978-0-08-085817-3.
- Chromatography: the Separation Technique of the 20th Century, Chromatographia Vol. 51, No. 1/2, January 2000, pp. 7–17 (Centennial Review).

== Awards and honors ==
- Csaba Horváth Medal of the Connecticut Separation Science Council (2001)
- Keene P. Dimick Award in Chromatography of the Society of Analytical Chemists of Pittsburgh (1998)
- Jubilee Award of the International Symposium on Capillary Chromatography (1998)
- Golden Diploma from Budapest Technical University (1995)
- Elected Honorary Member, Hungarian Chemical Society (1992)
- Marcel J. E. Golay Award of the International Symposium on Capillary Chromatography (1992)
- M. S. Tswett Medal of the Russian Chromatography Society (1991)
- Pioneer in the Development of Analytical Instrumentation of the first James L. Waters Symposium at the 41st PittCon (1990)
- National Award in Chromatography of the American Chemical Society (1985)
- A. J. P. Martin Gold Award of the Chromatography Discussion Group (1982)
- Anniversary Medal of Tartu University (Estonia, 1981)
- L.S. Palmer Award of the Minnesota Chromatography Forum (1980)
- Anniversary M.S. Tswett Chromatography Medal of the All-Union Scientific Council on Chromatography of the USSR Academy of Sciences (1979)
- M.S. Tswett Award in Chromatography of the International Symposium on Advances in Chromatography (1978)

== Sources ==
- "Leslie Stephen Ettre," Obituary, Hartford Courant, June 4, 2010.
- C. W. Gerhke, Chromatography: A Century of Discovery 1900–2000 : The Bridge to the Sciences/Technology Journal of Chromatography Library Vol. 64 (Elsevier, 2001), pp. 178 – 179.
- "Happy Birthday Professor Leslie S. Ettre," Chromatographia, (2007) 66 (5–6), 301.
