= Centrifugal partition chromatography =

Centrifugal partition chromatography is a special chromatographic technique where both stationary and mobile phase are liquid, and the stationary phase is immobilized by a strong centrifugal force. Centrifugal partition chromatography consists of a series-connected network of extraction cells, which operates as elemental extractors, and the efficiency is guaranteed by the cascade.

== History ==
In the 1940s Craig invented the first apparatus to conduct countercurrent partitioning; he called this the countercurrent distribution Craig apparatus. The apparatus consists of a series of glass tubes that are designed and arranged such that the lighter liquid phase is transferred from one tube to the next. The next major milestone was droplet countercurrent chromatography (DCCC). It uses only gravity to move the mobile phase through the stationary phase which is held in long vertical tubes connected in series. The modern era of CCC began with the development of the planetary centrifuge by Ito which was first introduced in 1966 as a closed helical tube which was rotated on a "planetary" axis as is turned on a "sun" axis. Centrifugal partition chromatography was introduced in Japan in 1982; the first instrument was built at Sanki Eng. Ltd. in Kyoto. The first instrument consisted of twelve cartridges arranged around the rotor of a centrifuge; the inner volume of each cartridge was about 15 mL for 50 channels. In 1999 Kromaton developed the first FCPC with radial cells. During cell development, the Z cell was completed in 2005 and the twin cell in 2009. In 2017 RotaChrom designed its top performing CPC cells through computed fluid dynamic simulation software by László Németh and László Lorántfy. After thousands of simulations, this tool revealed the drawbacks of conventional CPC cell designs and highlighted the unparallel load capacity and scalable cell design of RotaChrom.

Both researchers left RotaChrom in Sept 1 2019.

In 2022, László Németh founded LiLiChro, where he continued his research on better and more efficient cells. His team is currently working on 2 more patents, further strengthening the position of CPC in chromatography.

== Operation ==
The extraction cells consist of hollow bodies with inlets and outlets of liquid connection. The cells are first filled with the liquid chosen to be the stationary phase. Under rotation, the pumping of the mobile phase is started, which enters the cells from the inlet. When entering the flow of mobiles phase forms small droplets according to the Stokes' law, which is called atomization. These droplets fall through the stationary phase, creating a high interface area, which is called the extraction. At the end of the cells, these droplets unite due to the surface tension, which is called settling.

When a sample mixture is injected as a plug into the flow of mobile phase the compounds of the mixtures elute according to their partition coefficients: $V_{elution}=V_{dead-volume}+K_{upper/lower}*V_{stationary-phase}$

Centrifugal partition chromatography requires only a biphasic mixture of solvents, so by varying the constitution of the solvent system it is possible to tune the partition coefficients of different compounds so that separation is guaranteed by the high selectivity.

=== Comparison with countercurrent chromatography ===
Countercurrent chromatography and centrifugal partition chromatography are two different instrumental realization of the same liquid–liquid chromatographic theory. Countercurrent chromatography usually uses a planetary gear motion without rotary seals, while centrifugal partition chromatography uses circular rotation with rotary seals for liquid connection. CCC has interchanging mixing and settling zones in the coil tube, so atomization, extraction and settling are time and zone separated. Inside centrifugal partition chromatography, all three steps happen continuously in one time, inside the cells.

Advantages of centrifugal partition chromatography:

- Higher flow rate for same volume size Laboratory scale example: 250 mL centrifugal partition chromatography has optimal flow rate of 5–15 mL/min, 250 mL countercurrent chromatography has optimal flow rate of 1–3 mL/min. Process scale example: 25 L countercurrent chromatography has optimal flow rate of 100–300 ml/min, 25 L centrifugal partition chromatography has optimal flow rate of 1000–3000 ml/min.
- Higher productivity (due to higher flow rate and faster separation time)
- Scalable up to tonnes per month
- Better stationary phase retention for most phases

Disadvantages of centrifugal partition chromatography:

- Higher pressure than CCC (typical operation pressures of 40–160 bar vs 5–25 bar)
  - As the pressure drops on the LiLiChro's rotor with the new cells is less than 10bar, this disadvantage has been overcome by the technology and the all-new rotary union seals will last for years of continuous use.
- Rotary seal wear over time

== Laboratory scale ==
Centrifugal partition chromatography has been extensively used for isolation and purification of natural products for 40 years. Due to the ability to get very high selectivity, and the ability to tolerate samples containing particulated matter, it is possible to work with direct extracts of biomass, opposed to traditional liquid chromatography, where impurities degrade the solid stationary phase so that separation become impossible.

There are numerous laboratory scale centrifugal partition chromatography manufacturers around the world, like Gilson (Armen Instrument), Kromaton (Rousselet Robatel), and AECS-QUIKPREP. These instruments operate at flow rates of 1–500 mL/min. with stationary phase retentions of 40–80%.

With the new rotor system created after 2022, LiLiChro was able to create a truly analytical instrument (miniLiLi) with a rotor internal volume of only 34ml, which means it can operate at a flow rate of 1ml/min. On the other hand, both the miniLiLi and the 140ml midiLiLi can operate with 90+% stationary phase retention.

== Production scale ==
Centrifugal partition chromatography does not use any solid stationary phase, so it guarantees a cost-effective separation for the highest industrial levels. As opposed to countercurrent chromatography, it is possible to get very high flow rates (for example 10 liters / min) with active stationary phase ratio of >80%, which guarantees good separation and high productivity. As in centrifugal partition chromatography, material is dissolved, and loaded the column in mass / volume units, loading capability can be much higher than standard solid-liquid chromatographic techniques, where material is loaded to the active surface area of the stationary phase, which takes up less than 10% of the column.

Industrial instrument like Gilson (Armen Instrument), Kromaton (Rousselet Robatel), RotaChrom Technologies (RotaChrom) differ from laboratory scale instruments by the applicable flow rate with satisfactory stationary phase retention (70–90%). LiLiChro's solution is no different from analytics, so it can be scaled up in a completely linear way, and the stationary phase retention is higher than 90% in every case. Industrial instruments have flow rates of multiple liter / minutes, while able to purify materials from 10 kg to tonnes per month.

Operating the production scale equipment requires industrial volume solvent preparation (mixer/settler) and solvent recovery equipment.

== Continuous production ==
A common method of increasing efficiency in industrial chromatography is continuous production. There, this is done with SMB (Simulated Moving Bed). In liquid-liquid chromatography, there is no need to simulate a moving bed, as we can move it in reality, and therefore it is TMB, i.e. True Moving Bed. The essence of TMB is to continuously switch the device between ASC and DSC modes, effectively creating a moving bed. This technique is much cheaper than SMB, and its efficiency is not lagging behind. TMB systems are available from mg to tone capacity from LiLiChro.

== Comparison of CPC Equipment Manufacturers ==
CPC manufacturers and our devices
Company name	Instrument type	Working pressure	Rotor volume	Flow rate	Stationary phase retention
GILSON	SCPC - 100	8 – 10 MPa 80 – 100 bar 1160 – 1450 psi	0.100 [l]	15 [ml/min]	50 – 70%
GILSON	SCPC - 250	8 – 10 MPa 80 – 100 bar 1160 – 1450 psi	0.250 [l]	15 [ml/min]	50 – 70%
GILSON	SCPC - 1000	8 – 10 MPa 80 – 100 bar 1160 – 1450 psi	1 [l]	50 [ml/min]	50 – 70%
GILSON	VCPC - 5000	8 – 10 MPa 80 – 100 bar 1160 – 1450 psi	5 [l]	2 [l/min]	50 – 70%
KROMATON	FCPC-A/C 25	8 – 10 MPa 80 – 100 bar 1160 – 1450psi	0.025 [l]	1 – 10 [ml/min]	50 – 70%
KROMATON	FCPC-A 50	8 – 10 MPa 80 – 100 bar 1160 – 1450psi	0.050 [l]	1 – 10 [ml/min]	50 – 70%
KROMATON	FCPC-A 200	8 – 10 MPa 80 – 100 bar 1160 – 1450psi	0.200 [l]	3 – 20 [ml/min]	50 – 70%
KROMATON	FCPC-A 1000	8 – 10 MPa 80 – 100 bar 1160 – 1450psi	1 [l]	10 – 50 [ml/min]	50 – 70%
KROMATON	FCPC-D 5000	8 – 10 MPa 80 – 100 bar 1160 – 1450psi	5 [l]	700 [ml/min]	50 – 70%
KROMATON	FCPC-D 10000	8 – 10 MPa 80 – 100 bar 1160 – 1450psi	10 [l]	1,5 [l/min]	50 – 70%
LiLiChro	miniLiLi	1.5 – 3 Mpa 15 – 30 bar 217 – 435 psi	0.034 [l]	1 – 5 [ml/min]	80 – 90%
LiLiChro	midiLiLi	1.5 – 3 Mpa 15 – 30 bar 217 – 435 psi	0.140 [l]	4 – 20 [ml/min]	80 – 90%
LiLiChro	maxiLiLi	1.5 – 3 Mpa 15 – 30 bar 217 – 435 psi	3.5 [l]	50 – 300 [ml/min]	80 – 90%
LiLiChro	prepLiLi	1.5 – 3 Mpa 15 – 30 bar 217 – 435 psi	100 [l]	1 – 6 [l/min]	80 – 90%
RotaChrom	Modeler	8 – 10 MPa 80 – 100 bar 1160 – 1450 psi	0.250 [l]	1 – 10 [ml/min]	50 – 90%
RotaChrom	rCPC	8 – 10 MPa 80 – 100 bar 1160 – 1450 psi	2.2 [l]	100 – 300 [ml/min]	50 – 90%
RotaChrom	iCPC	8 – 10 MPa 80 – 100 bar 1160 – 1450 psi	23 [l]	2 – 4 [l/min]	50 – 90%

Rotor volume
Company name	Min.	Max.
GILSON	0.100 l	5 l
KROMATON	0.025 l	10 l
RotaChrom	0.250 l	23 l
LiLiChro	0.034 l	100 l

== See also ==
- Chromatography
- Radial chromatography

== Books ==
- 1995 - Centrifugal partition Chromatography - Chromatographic Science Series - Volume 68, Editor: Alain P. Foucault, Marcel Dekker Inc
