= Craig tube =

Laboratory glassware

A Craig tube is an item of apparatus used in small-scale (up to about 100 mg) preparative and analytical chemistry, particularly for recrystallisation. It was invented by Lyman C. Craig and Otto W. Post.

A Craig tube consists of two parts. The first is a stout-walled test tube with a working volume of about 1–5 ml (say, 7–8 cm in length and 1–1.5 cm in diameter). There is a constriction towards the open end of the tube. The second is a loosely fitting, generally cylindrical stopper, possibly with a teardrop-shaped head, of glass or of another inert material such as PTFE, which seats on the constriction.

Recrystallisation is carried out in the usual manner, by dissolving the solid to be purified in a solvent and causing crystals of the solid to form. The stopper can be used to protect the solution from atmospheric contamination. The crystals are separated from the mother liquor by placing the tube and stopper – inverted – in a centrifuge tube, followed by centrifugation. The stopper allows the mother liquor to pass into the centrifuge tube but retains the crystals, which can subsequently be recrystallised again or collected.

The apparatus has the advantages that the crystallised product is relatively dry, is free from contamination by fibres from filter paper, and can be recovered more efficiently than from a sinter funnel.

Craig tubes can be made by competent glassblowers, and are also available commercially.
