= Salt Waste Processing Facility =

The Salt Waste Processing Facility (SWPF) is a nuclear waste treatment facility for the United States Department of Energy's Nuclear Reservation Savannah River Site in Aiken, South Carolina. It was designed, constructed and commissioned by the Parsons Corporation for treatment of nuclear salt waste and became operational in 2021.

== Background ==
The Savannah River Site (SRS) presently contains legacy nuclear waste from the production of nuclear materials between 1951 and 2002. The nuclear waste is stored in large (typically 1 million US gallons (3,800 m^{3}) nominal capacity) underground double walled storage tanks located in F-Area and H-Area tank farms.

Upon completion, the Salt Waste Processing Facility (SWPF) will be the cornerstone of the Savannah River Site (SRS) salt processing strategy. It is designed to be capable of processing 6 million US gallons (23,000 m^{3}) of salt solution per year. The waste currently in storage at SRS presently includes approximately 84 million US gallons (320,000 m^{3}) of salt solution that must be processed, of which 75 million US gallons (280,000 m^{3}) are projected to be processed through SWPF.

SWPF will use specific processes that have been developed at Oak Ridge National Laboratory and Argonne National Laboratory using annular centrifugal contactors and that will be the state-of-the-art methods to target the removal of cesium-137, strontium-90, and actinides from SRS salt wastes. SWPF will remove approximately 99.998% of the cesium-137/barium-137 (metastable) activity while also removing strontium and actinides (Ref 1).

== Planned Deployment of SWPF Treatment Facility ==
About 33.8 million US gallons (128,000 m^{3}) of salt waste are currently stored in underground waste storage tanks at SRS. This waste, along with future salt waste forecast to be sent to the tank farms, will be processed through DDA, ARP/MCU, and the SWPF. DOE estimated in preparing the Section 3116 Determination that an additional 41.3 Mgal of unconcentrated salt waste would have been received by the Tank Farms between December 1, 2004, and the completion of salt waste processing. After both liquid removal by processing through the Tank Farm evaporator systems and later additions of liquid for saltcake dissolution and chemistry adjustments required for processing, approximately 84 Mgal (5.9 Mgal existing salt waste through the DDA process, 1.0 Mgal future salt waste through the DDA process, 2.1 Mgal existing and future salt waste through ARP/MCU, 69.1 Mgal existing salt waste through SWPF, and 5.9 Mgal future salt waste through SWPF) of salt solution will be processed by Interim Salt Processing and High Capacity Salt Processing resulting in approximately 168 Mgal of grout output from the Saltstone Production Facility to be disposed of in the Saltstone Disposal Facility. (DOE Amended Decision)

== Planned Start Date Delayed ==
The start date for SWPF operations has been delayed to allow for modification of the SWPF preliminary design to incorporate a higher degree of performance category (PC)in the confinement barriers necessary for worker protection during natural phenomena hazard events. The Defense Nuclear Facilities Safety Board initially identified concerns related to the PC designations of the SWPF in August, 2004. DOE agreed in November, 2005, to modify the SWPF design after extensive analysis and review, resulting in an approximate two-year delay in the planned startup of SWPF. DOE anticipates that it will continue to explore possible ways to improve the schedule for design and construction of the SWPF. It remains DOE's goal to complete processing of salt waste through the SWPF by 2019 although this date may need to be modified in the future. Despite this projected delay, DOE will not increase the quantity of waste (total curies) to be disposed of in the Saltstone Disposal Facility, nor increase the quantities (curies) processed with interim processes or SWPF from those described here and in the Draft Section 3116 Determination for Salt Waste Disposal at the Savannah River Site and the Section 3116 Determination for Salt Waste Disposal at the Savannah River Site. Therefore, the date change does not affect the analyses in the Section 3116 Determination for Salt Waste Disposal at the Savannah River Site, its supporting documents, or the Nuclear Regulatory Commission (NRC) consultation. The modified schedule is reflected in the Section 3116 Determination for Salt Waste Disposal at the Savannah River. However, the technical and programmatic documents that are referenced by the Section 3116 Determination for Salt Waste Disposal at the Savannah River Site have not been updated to reflect this new date because the schedule change did not occur until after those documents were completed. (DOE Amended decision).

== See also ==
- Nuclear fuel cycle
- MOX fuel
