= Droplet countercurrent chromatography =

Droplet countercurrent chromatography (DCCC or DCC) was introduced in 1970 by Tanimura, Pisano, Ito, and Bowman. DCCC is considered to be a form of liquid-liquid separation, which includes countercurrent distribution and countercurrent chromatography, that employs a liquid stationary phase held in a collection of vertical glass columns connected in series. The mobile phase passes through the columns in the form of droplets. The DCCC apparatus may be run with the lower phase stationary and the upper phase being introduced to the bottom of each column. Or it may be run with the upper phase stationary and the lower phase being introduced from the top of the column. In both cases, the work of gravity is allowed influence the two immiscible liquids of different densities to form the signature droplets that rise or descend through the column. The mobile phase is pumped at a rate that will allow droplets to form that maximize the mass transfer of a compound between the upper and lower phases. Compounds that are more soluble in the upper phase will travel quickly through the column, while compounds that are more soluble in the stationary phase will linger. Separation occurs because different compounds distribute differently, in a ratio called the partition coefficient, between the two phases.

The biphasic solvent system must be carefully formulated so that it will perform appropriately in the DCCC column. The solvent system must form two phases without excess emulsification in order to form droplets. The densities of the two phases must also be sufficiently different so that the phases will move past each other in the column. Many DCCC solvent systems contain both chloroform and water. The solvent system used in the seminal publication was made from chloroform, acetic acid, and aqueous 0.1 M hydrochloric acid. Many subsequent solvents systems were made with chloroform, methanol, and water which is sometimes represented as a ChMWat solvent system. Solvent systems formulated with ''n''-butanol, water and a modifier such as acetic acid, pyridine or n-propanol have also enjoyed some success in DCCC. In some cases, non-aqueous biphasic solvent systems such as acetonitrile and methanol have been utilized.

The main difference between DCCC and other types of countercurrent chromatography techniques is that there is no vigorous mixing of phases to enhance the mass transfer of compounds that allows them to distribute between the two phases. In 1951 Kies and Davis described an apparatus similar to the DCCC. They created a series of open tubes that were arranged in a cascade to either drip a more dense phase through a less dense stationary phase or, conversely, a less dense phase could be introduced into the bottom of the tube to dribble through the more dense phase. In 1954, a fractionation column was introduced by Kepes the resembled a CCC column divided into chambers with perforated plastic disks. Similar DCCC-type instruments have been created by A. E. Kostanyan and collaborators which employ vertical columns that are divided into partitions with porous disks. Once the columns are filled with stationary phase, the mobile phase is pumped through, not continuously but, in pulses. The solvent motion created by a pulsed pumping action creates the mixing and settling that is common to most all forms of countercurrent chromatography.

== Applications ==
DCCC has been employed to separate a wide variety of phytochemicals from their crude extracts. The long list of natural product separations includes: saponins, alkaloids, senna glycosides, monosaccarides, triterpene glycosides, flavone glycosides, xanthones, iridoid glycosides, vitamin B_{12}, lignans, imbricatolic acid, gallic acid, carotenoids, and triterpenoids.

DCCC instruments have been commercially manufactured and distributed by Büchi and Tokyo Rikakikai (Eyela).
