= Separation process =

Method that converts a mixture or solution into two or more distinct products

A separation process is a method that converts a mixture or a solution of chemical substances into two or more distinct product mixtures, a scientific process of separating two or more substances in order to obtain purity. At least one product mixture from the separation is enriched in one or more of the source mixture's constituents. In some cases, a separation may fully divide the mixture into pure constituents. Separations exploit differences in chemical properties or physical properties (such as size, shape, charge, mass, density, or chemical affinity) between the constituents of a mixture.

Processes are often classified according to the particular properties they exploit to achieve separation. If no single difference can be used to accomplish the desired separation, multiple operations can often be combined to achieve the desired end. Different processes are also sometimes categorized by their separating agent, i.e. mass separating agents or energy separating agents. Mass separating agents operate by addition of material to induce separation like the addition of an anti-solvent to induce precipitation. In contrast, energy-based separations cause separation by heating or cooling as in distillation.

Elements and compounds in nature are impure to some degree. Often these raw materials must go through a separation before they can be put to productive use, making separation techniques essential for the modern industrial economy.

The purpose of separation may be:

- analytical: to identify the size of each fraction of a mixture is attributable to each component without attempting to harvest the fractions.
- preparative: to "prepare" fractions for input into processes that benefit when components are separated.

Separations may be performed on a small scale, as in a laboratory for analytical purposes, or on a large scale, as in a chemical plant.

== Complete and incomplete separation ==
Some types of separation require complete purification of a certain component. An example is the production of aluminum metal from bauxite ore through electrolysis refining. In contrast, an incomplete separation process may specify an output to consist of a mixture instead of a single pure component. A good example of an incomplete separation technique is oil refining. Crude oil occurs naturally as a mixture of various hydrocarbons and impurities. The refining process splits this mixture into other, more valuable mixtures such as natural gas, gasoline and chemical feedstocks, none of which are pure substances, but each of which must be separated from the raw crude.

In both complete separation and incomplete separation, a series or cascade of separations may be necessary to obtain the desired end products. In the case of oil refining, crude is subjected to a long series of individual distillation steps, each of which produces a different product or intermediate.

== List of separation techniques ==
- Centrifugation and cyclonic separation, separates based on density differences
- Chelation
- Chromatography separates dissolved substances by different interaction with (i.e., travel through) a material.
  - High-performance liquid chromatography (HPLC)
  - Thin-layer chromatography (TLC)
  - Countercurrent chromatography (CCC)
  - Droplet countercurrent chromatography (DCC)
  - Paper chromatography
  - Ion chromatography
  - Size-exclusion chromatography (SEC)
  - Affinity chromatography
  - Centrifugal partition chromatography
  - Gas chromatography and Inverse gas chromatography
- Crystallization
- Decantation
- Demister (vapor), removes liquid droplets from gas streams
- Distillation, used for mixtures of liquids with different boiling points
- Drying, removes liquid from a solid by vaporization or evaporation
- Electrophoresis, separates organic molecules based on their different interaction with a gel under an electric potential (i.e., different travel)
  - Capillary electrophoresis
- Electrostatic separation, works on the principle of corona discharge, where two plates are placed close together and high voltage is applied. This high voltage is used to separate the ionized particles.
- Elutriation
- Evaporation
- Extraction
  - Leaching
  - Liquid–liquid extraction
  - Solid phase extraction
  - Supercritical fluid extraction
  - Subcritical fluid extraction
- Field flow fractionation
- Filtration – Mesh, bag and paper filters are used to remove large particulates suspended in fluids (e.g., fly ash) while membrane processes including microfiltration, ultrafiltration, nanofiltration, reverse osmosis, dialysis (biochemistry) utilising synthetic membranes, separates micrometre-sized or smaller species
- Flocculation, separates a solid from a liquid in a colloid, by use of a flocculant, which promotes the solid clumping into flocs
- Fractional distillation
- Fractional freezing
- Magnetic separation
- Oil-water separation, gravimetrically separates suspended oil droplets from waste water in oil refineries, petrochemical and chemical plants, natural gas processing plants and similar industries
- Precipitation
- Recrystallization
- Scrubbing, separation of particulates (solids) or gases from a gas stream using liquid.
- Sedimentation, separates using vocal density pressure differences
  - Gravity separation
- Sieving
- Sponge, adhesion of atoms, ions or molecules of gas, liquid, or dissolved solids to a surface
- Stripping
- Sublimation
- Vapor–liquid separation, separates by gravity, based on the Souders–Brown equation
- Winnowing
- Zone refining

== See also ==
- Analytical chemistry – Study of the separation, identification, and quantification of matter
- Chemical process – A method or means of somehow changing one or more chemicals or chemical compounds.
- High-performance liquid chromatography – Technique in analytical chemistry
- Unit operation – Basic step in a process
- Filtration – Process that separates solids from fluids
