= Friedrich Goppelsroeder =

Swiss chemist (1837–1919)

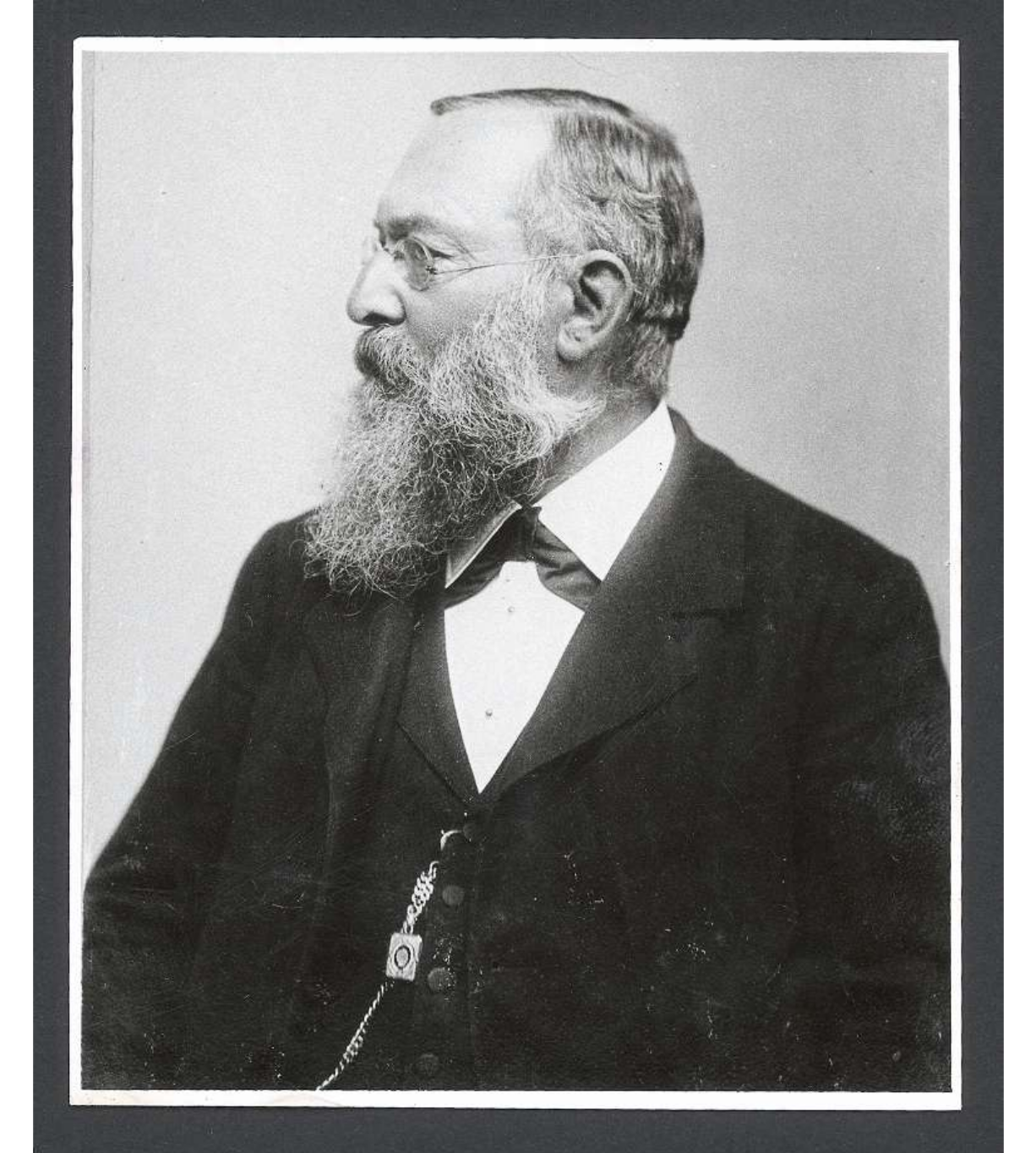
Christoph Friedrich Goppelsroeder

Christoph Friedrich Goppelsroeder (1 April 1837, in Basel – 14 October 1919, in Basel) was a Swiss chemist, best known for his studies of "capillary analysis", a precursor of paper chromatography.

He studied chemistry at the University of Basel as a student of Christian Friedrich Schönbein, then furthered his education at the University of Berlin under Franz Leopold Sonnenschein and Heinrich Rose, and also at Heidelberg University, where he was a pupil of Robert Bunsen. In 1858 he received his doctorate, and three years later, qualified as a lecturer at Basel. In 1869 he became an associate professor of chemistry at the university, and from 1872 to 1880 served as director of the chemistry school in Mulhouse. From 1880 onward, he worked at private research, then in 1896 returned to the University of Basel.

== Selected works ==
- Ueber Petroleum und dessen Producte; nebst einem Anhange über Feuerlöschmittel, 1869 – On petroleum and its products.
- Ueber die Darstellung der Farbstoffe sowie über deren gleichzeitige bildung und fixation auf den fasern mit hilfe der elektrolyse, 1885 – On characterization of dyes, as well as on their simultaneous formation and fixation on fibers with the help of electrolysis.
- Capillaranalyse beruhend auf capillaritäts- und adsorptionserscheinungen, 1901 – Capillary analysis based on capillary and adsorption phenomena.
- Studien über die anwendung der capillar-analyse, 1904 – Studies on the application of capillary analysis.
  - I. bei harnuntersuchungen – In urinalysis.
  - II. bei vitalen tinktionsversuchen – In vital tincture tests.
