= Two-dimensional chromatography =

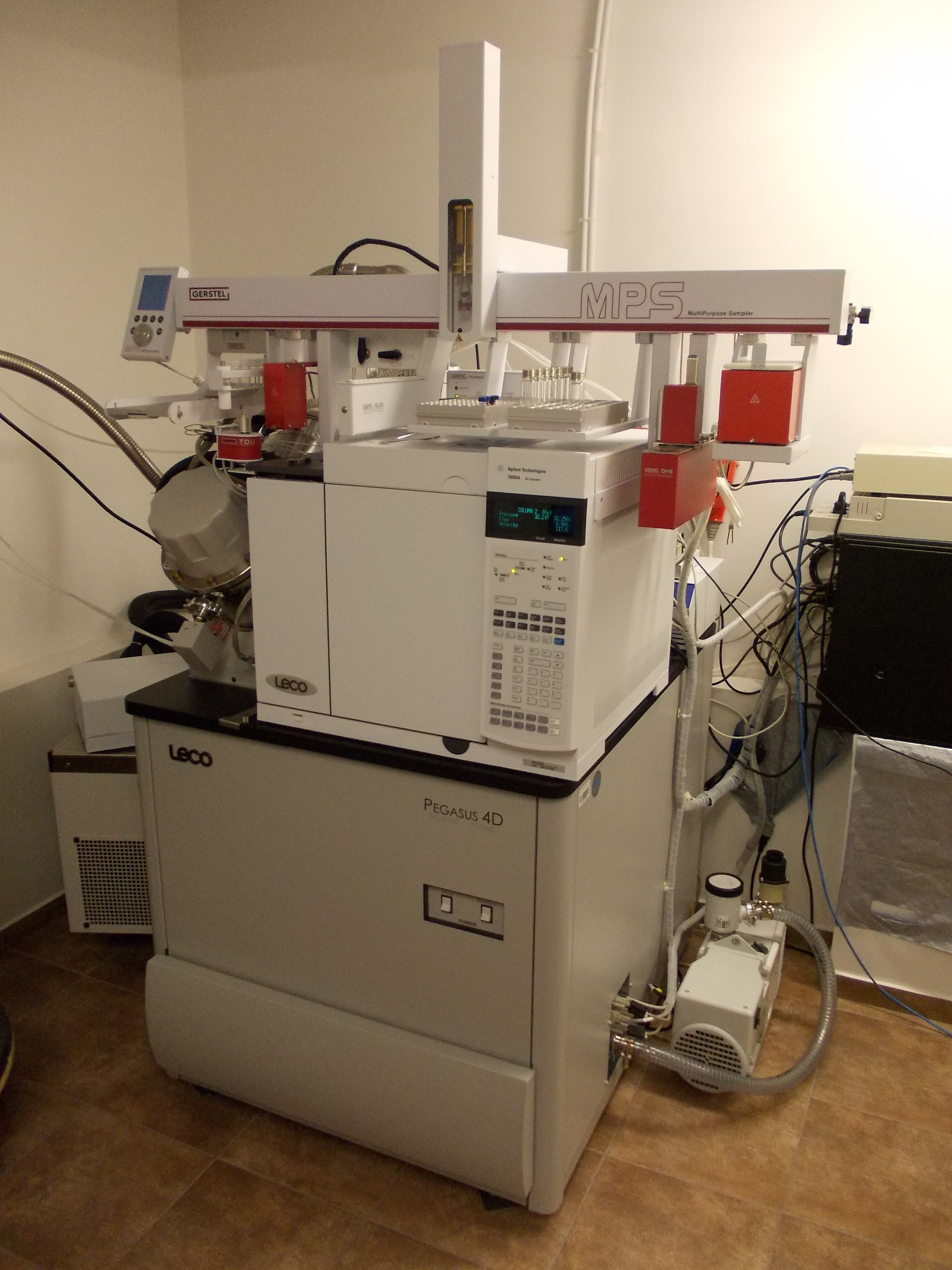
Two-dimensional chromatograph GCxGC-TOFMS at Chemical Faculty of GUT Gdańsk, Poland, 2016

Two-dimensional chromatography is a type of chromatographic technique in which the injected sample is separated by passing through two different separation stages. Two different chromatographic columns are connected in sequence, and the effluent from the first system is transferred onto the second column. Typically the second column has a different separation mechanism, so that bands that are poorly resolved from the first column may be completely separated in the second column. (For instance, a C18 reversed-phase chromatography column may be followed by a phenyl column.) Alternately, the two columns might run at different temperatures. During the second stage of separation the rate at which the separation occurs must be faster than the first stage, since there is still only a single detector. The plane surface is amenable to sequential development in two directions using two different solvents.

== History ==
Modern two-dimensional chromatographic techniques are based on the results of the early developments of paper chromatography and thin-layer chromatography (TLC) which involved liquid mobile phases and solid stationary phases. These techniques would later generate modern gas chromatography (GC) and liquid chromatography (LC) analysis. Different combinations of one-dimensional GC and LC produced the analytical chromatographic technique that is known as two-dimensional chromatography.

The earliest form of 2D-chromatography came in the form of a multi-step TLC separation in which a thin sheet of cellulose is used first with one solvent in one direction, then, after the paper has been dried, another solvent is run in a direction at right angles to the first. This methodology first appeared in the literature with a 1944 publication by A. J. P. Martin and coworkers detailing an efficient method for separating amino acids – "...but the two-dimensional chromatogram is especially convenient, in that it shows at a glance information that can be gained otherwise only as the result of numerous experiments" (Biochem J., 1944, 38, 224).

== Examples ==
Two-dimensional separations can be carried out in gas chromatography or liquid chromatography. Various different coupling strategies have been developed to "resample" from the first column into the second. Some important hardware for two-dimensional separations are Deans' switch and Modulator, which selectively transfer the first dimension eluent to second dimension column.

The chief advantage of two-dimensional techniques is that they offer a large increase in peak capacity, without requiring extremely efficient separations in either column. (For instance, if the first column offers a peak capacity (k_{1})of 100 for a 10-minute separation, and the second column offers a peak capacity of 5 (k_{2}) in a 5-second separation, then the combined peak capacity may approach k_{1} × k_{2}=500, with the total separation time still ~ 10 minutes). 2D separations have been applied to the analysis of gasoline and other petroleum mixtures, and more recently to protein mixtures.

=== Tandem mass spectrometry ===
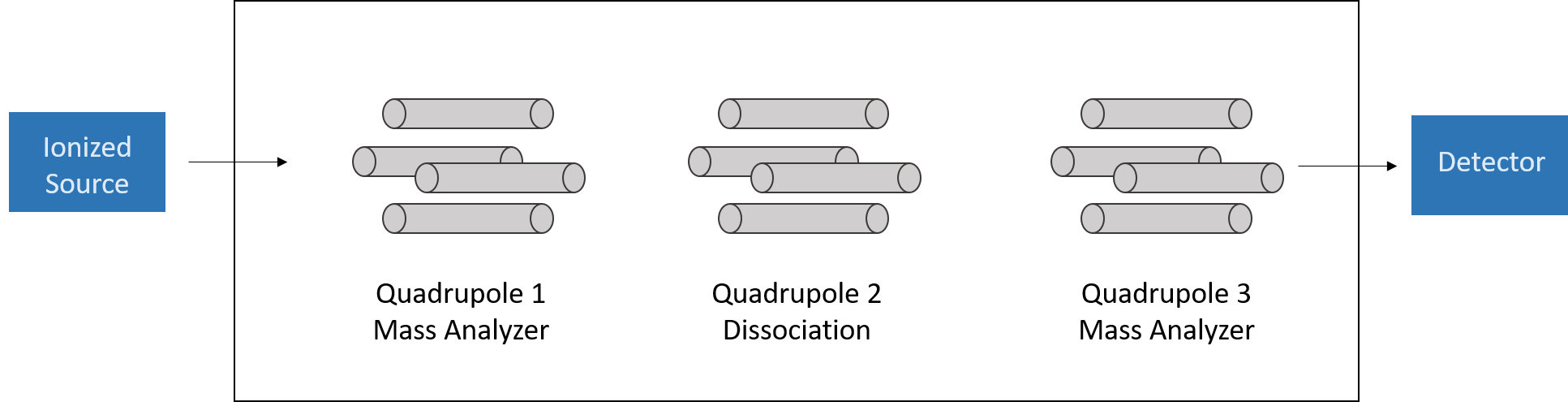
Diagram of a triple quadrupole (QQQ) mass analyzer

Tandem mass spectrometry (Tandem MS or MS/MS) uses two mass analyzers in sequence to separate more complex mixtures of analytes. The advantage of tandem MS is that it can be much faster than other two-dimensional methods, with times ranging from milliseconds to seconds. Because there is no dilution with solvents in MS, there is less probability of interference, so tandem MS can be more sensitive and have a higher signal-to-noise ratio compared to other two-dimensional methods. The main disadvantage associated with tandem MS is the high cost of the instrumentation needed. Prices can range from $500,000 to over $1 million. Many form of tandem MS involve a mass selection step and a fragmentation step. The first mass analyzer can be programmed to only pass molecules of a specific mass-to-charge ratio. Then the second mass analyzer can fragment the molecule to determine its identity. This can be especially useful for separating molecules of the same mass (i.e. proteins of the same mass or molecular isomers). Different types of mass analyzers can be coupled to achieve varying effects. One example would be a TOF-Quadrupole system. Ions can be sequentially fragmented and/or analyzed in a quadrupole as they leave the TOF in order of increasing m/z. Another prevalent tandem mass spectrometer is the quadrupole-quadrupole-quadrupole (Q-Q-Q) analyzer. The first quadrupole separates by mass, collisions take place in the second quadrupole, and the fragments are separated by mass in the third quadrupole.

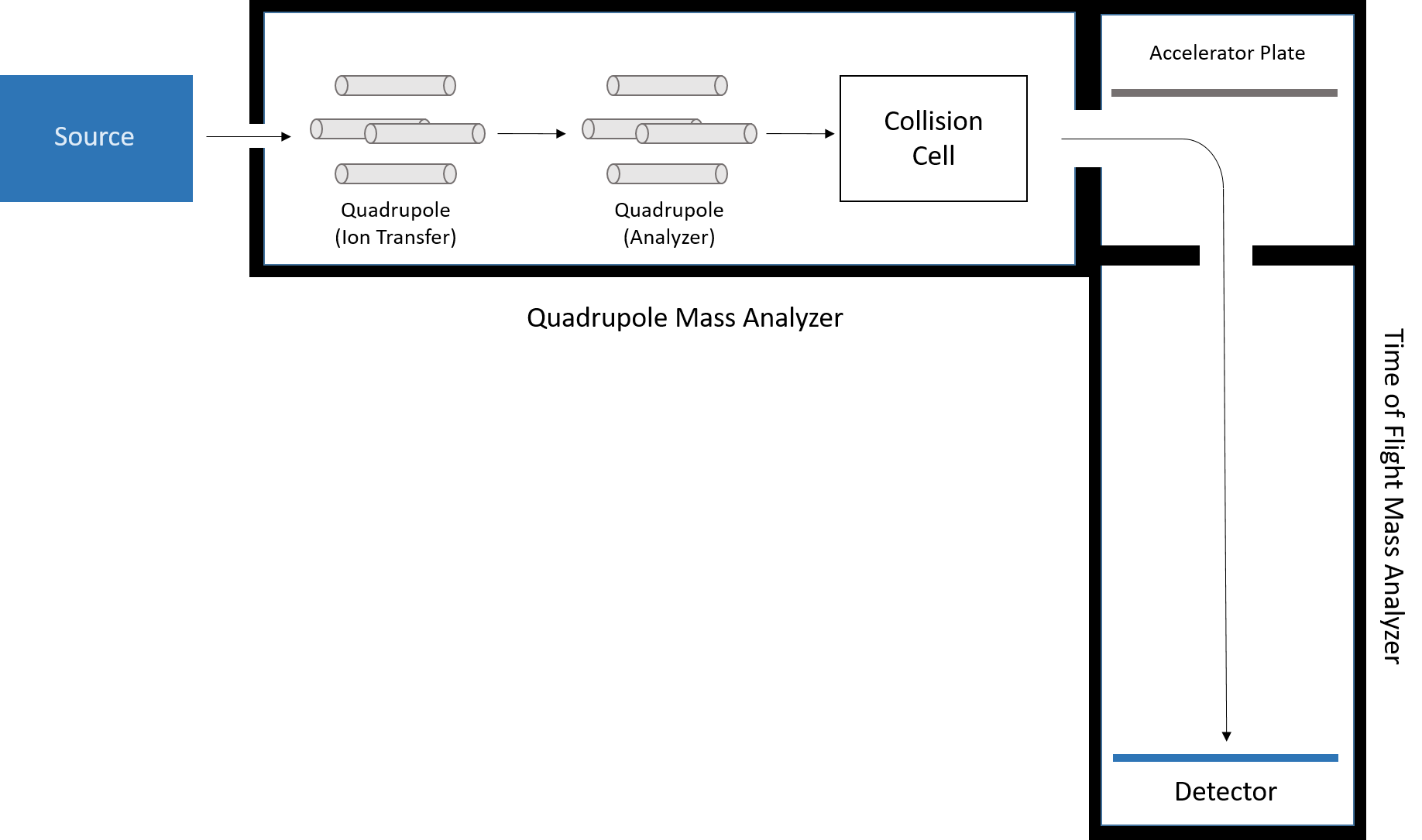
Diagram of a quadrupole/time of flight mass analyzer. The ionized source sample first enters the quadrupole mass analyzer, then enters the time of flight analyzer.

=== Gas chromatography-mass spectrometry ===
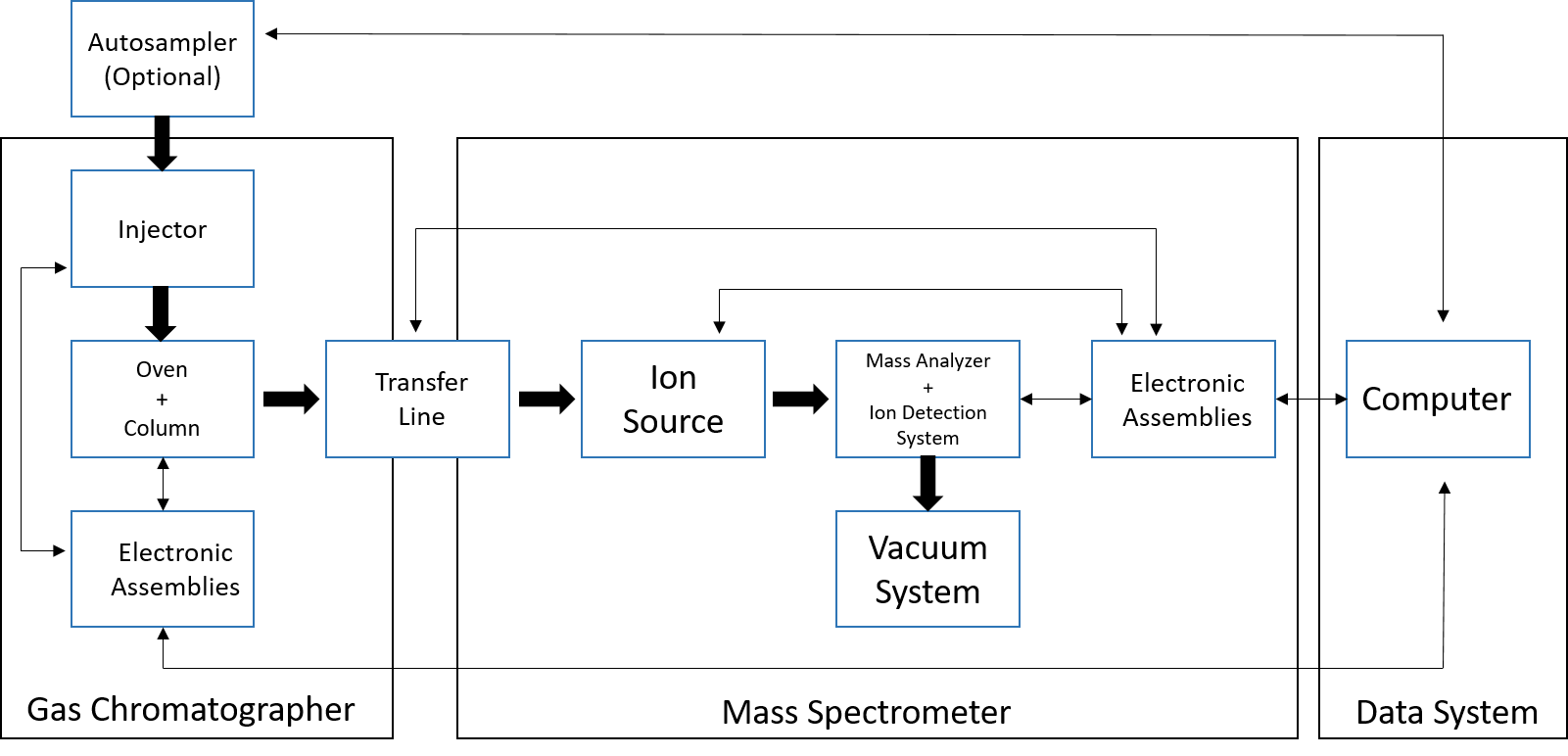
Diagram of GCMS. The diagram shows the pathway of the analyte. The analyte first passes through the gas chromatographer and then the separated analytes are subjected to mass analysis. Different types of mass analyzers, ToF, qudrupole, etc., can by used in the MS.

Gas chromatography-mass spectrometry (GC-MS) is a two-dimensional chromatography technique that combines the separation technique of gas chromatography with the identification technique of mass spectrometry. GC-MS is the single most important analytical tool for the analysis of volatile and semi-volatile organic compounds in complex mixtures. It works by first injecting the sample into the GC inlet where it is vaporized and pushed through a column by a carrier gas, typically helium. The analytes in the sample are separated based upon their interaction with the coating of the column, or the stationary phase, and the carrier gas, or the mobile phase. The compounds eluted from the column are converted into ions via electron impact (EI) or chemical ionization (CI) before traveling through the mass analyzer. The mass analyzer serves to separate the ions on a mass-to-charge basis. Popular choices perform the same function but differ in the way that they accomplish the separation. The analyzers typically used with GC-MS are the time-of-flight mass analyzer and the quadrupole mass analyzer. After leaving the mass analyzer, the analytes reach the detector and produce a signal that is read by a computer and used to create a gas chromatogram and mass spectrum. Sometimes GC-MS utilizes two gas chromatographers in particularly complex samples to obtain considerable separation power and be able to unambiguously assign the specific species to the appropriate peaks in a technique known as GCxGC-(MS). Ultimately, GC-MS is a technique utilized in many analytical laboratories and is a very effective and adaptable analytical tool.

=== Liquid chromatography-mass spectrometry ===
Liquid chromatography-mass spectrometry (LC/MS) couples high resolution chromatographic separation with MS detection. As the system adopts the high separation of HPLC, analytes which are in the liquid mobile phase are often ionized by various soft ionization methods including atmospheric pressure chemical ionization (APCI), electrospray ionization (ESI) or matrix-assisted laser desorption/ionization (MALDI), which attains the gas phase ionization required for the coupling with MS. These ionization methods allow the analysis of a wider range of biological molecules, including those with larger masses, thermally unstable or nonvolatile compounds where GC-MS is typically incapable of analyzing.

LC-MS provides high selectivity as unresolved peaks can be isolated by selecting a specific mass. Furthermore, better identification is also attained by mass spectra and the user does not have to rely solely on the retention time of analytes. As a result, molecular mass and structural information as well as quantitative data can all be obtained via LC-MS. LC-MS can therefore be applied to various fields, such as impurity identification and profiling in drug development and pharmaceutical manufacturing, since LC provides efficient separation of impurities and MS provides structural characterization for impurity profiling.

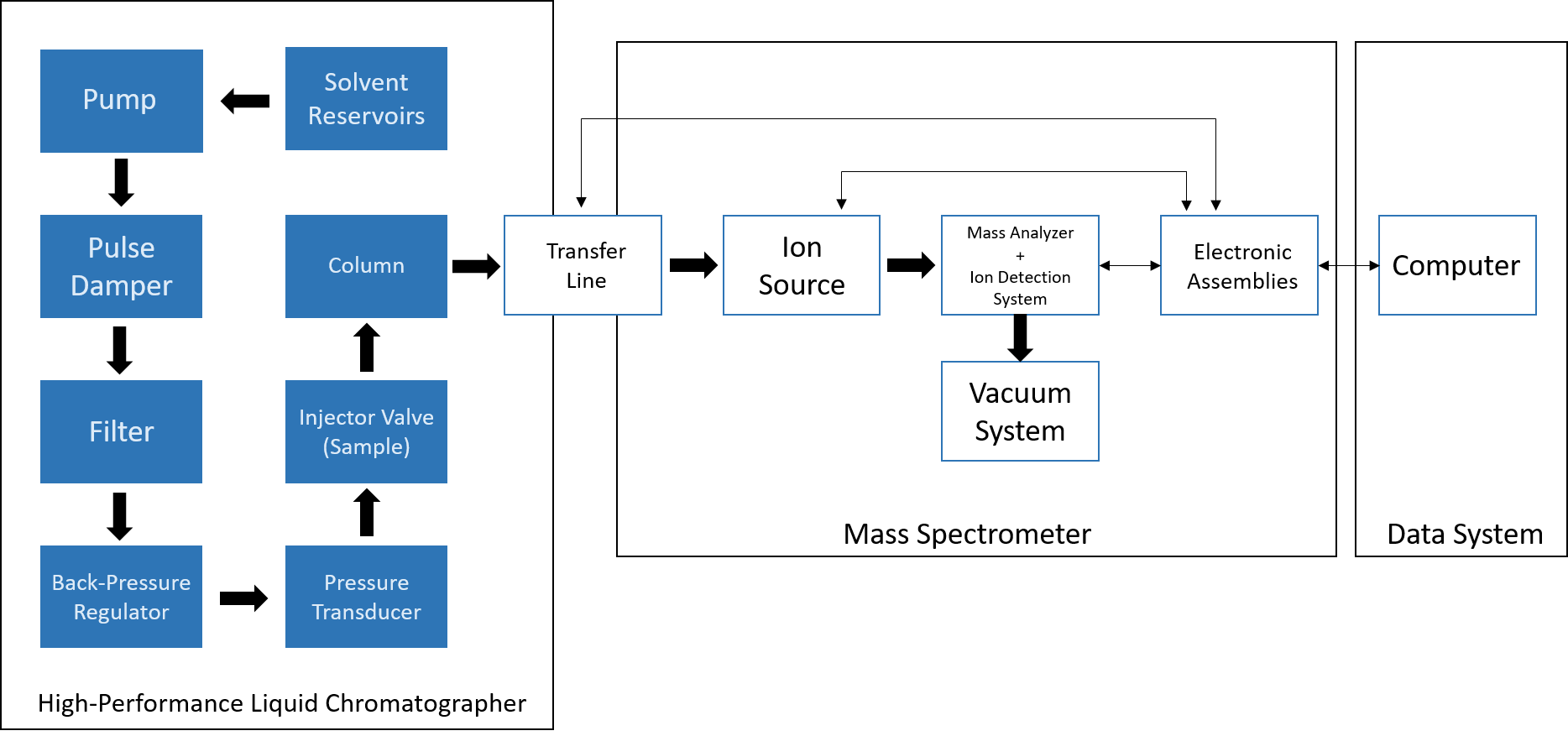
Diagram of LCMS. The sample is first subjected to analysis by HPLC and then is subjected to mass analysis. Different types of mass analyzers, ToF, qudrupole, etc., can be used in the MS.

Common solvents used in normal or reversed phase LC such as water, acetonitrile, and methanol are all compatible with ESI, yet a LC grade solvent may not be suitable for MS. Furthermore, buffers containing inorganic ions should be avoided as they may contaminate the ion source. Nonetheless, the problem can be resolved by 2D LC-MS, as well as other various issues including analyte coelution and UV detection responses.

=== Liquid chromatography-liquid chromatography ===
Two-dimensional liquid chromatography (2D-LC) combines two separate analyses of liquid chromatography into one data analysis. Modern 2D liquid chromatography has its origins in the late 1970s to early 1980s. During this time, the hypothesized principles of 2D-LC were being proven via experiments conducted along with supplementary conceptual and theoretical work. It was shown that 2D-LC could offer quite a bit more resolving power compared to the conventional techniques of one-dimensional liquid chromatography. In the 1990s, the technique of 2D-LC played an important role in the separation of extremely complex substances and materials found in the proteomics and polymer fields of study. Unfortunately, the technique had been shown to have a significant disadvantage when it came to analysis time. Early work with 2D-LC was limited to small portion of liquid phase separations due to the long analysis time of the machinery. Modern 2D-LC techniques tackled that disadvantage head on, and have significantly reduced what was once a damaging feature. Modern 2D-LC has an instrumental capacity for high resolution separations to be completed in an hour or less. Due to the growing need for instrumentation to perform analysis on substances of growing complexity with better detection limits, the development of 2D-LC pushes forward. Instrumental parts have become a mainstream industry focus and are much easier to attain then before. Prior to this, 2D-LC was performed using components from 1D-LC instruments, and would lead to results of varying degrees in both accuracy and precision. The reduced stress on instrumental engineering has allowed for pioneering work in the field and technique of 2D-LC.

The purpose of employing this technique is to separate mixtures that one-dimensional liquid chromatography otherwise cannot separate effectively. Two-dimensional liquid chromatography is better suited to analyzing complex mixtures samples such as urine, environmental substances and forensic evidence such as blood.

Difficulties in separating mixtures can be attributed to the complexity of the mixture in the sense that separation cannot occur due to the number of different effluents in the compound. Another problem associated with one-dimensional liquid chromatography involves the difficulty associated to resolving closely related compounds. Closely related compounds have similar chemical properties that may prove difficult to separate based on polarity, charge, etc. Two-dimensional liquid chromatography provides separation based on more than one chemical or physical property. Using an example from Nagy and Vekey, a mixture of peptides can be separated based on their basicity, but similar peptides may not elute well. Using a subsequent LC technique, the similar basicity between the peptides can be further separated by employing differences in apolar character.

As a result, to be able to separate mixtures more efficiently, a subsequent LC analysis must employ very different separation selectivity relative to the first column. Another requirement to effectively use 2D liquid chromatography, according to Bushey and Jorgenson, is to employ highly orthogonal techniques which means that the two separation techniques must be as different as possible.

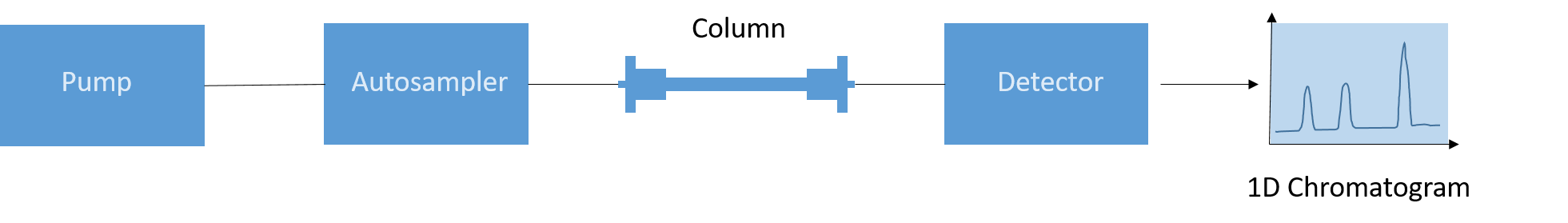
Diagram of 1-dimensional LC. An example of the spectral results of this technique is also shown.

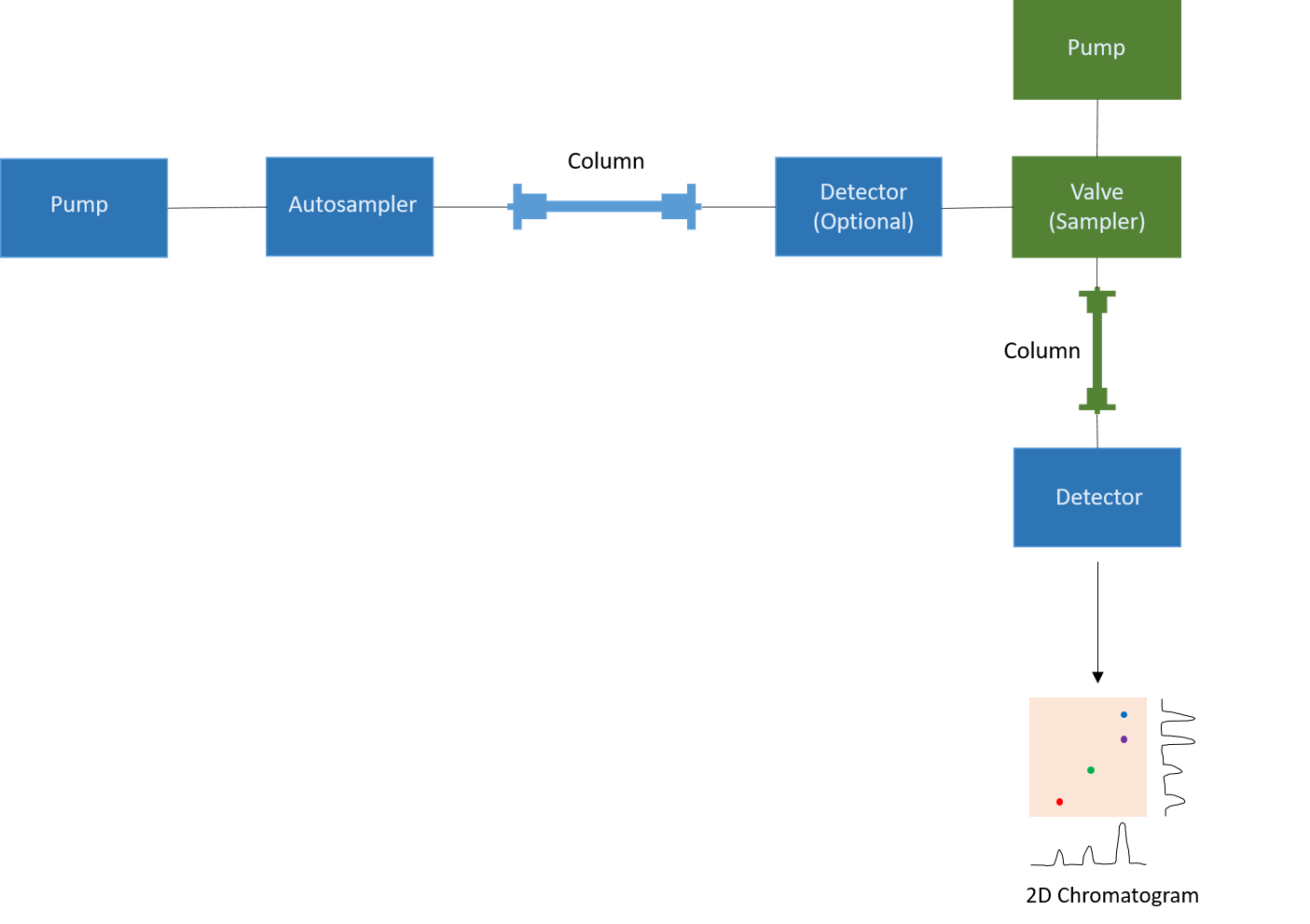
Diagram of 2-dimensional LC. An example of the spectral results of this specific technique is also shown.

There are two major classifications of 2D liquid chromatography. These include: Comprehensive 2D liquid chromatography (LCxLC) and Heart-cutting 2D liquid chromatography (LC-LC). In comprehensive 2D-LC, all the peaks from a column elution are fully sampled, but it has been deemed unnecessary to transfer the entire sample from the first to the second column. A portion of the sample is sent to waste while the rest is sent to the sampling valve. In heart-cutting 2D-LC specific peaks are targeted with only a small portion of the peak being injected onto a second column. Heart-cutting 2D-LC has proven to be quite useful for sample analysis of substances that are not very complex provided they have similar retention behavior. Compared to comprehensive 2D-LC, heart-cutting 2D-LC provides an effective technique with much less system setup and a much lower operating cost. Multiple heart-cutting (mLC-LC) may be utilized to sample multiple peaks from first dimensional analysis without risking temporary overlap of second dimensional analysis. Multiple heart-cutting (mLC-LC) utilizes a setup of multiple sampling loops.

For 2D-LC, peak capacity is a very important issue. This can be generated using gradient elution separation with much greater efficiency than an isocratic separation given a reasonable amount of time. While isocratic elution is much easier on a fast time scale, it is preferable to perform a gradient elution separation in the second dimension. The mobile phase strength is varied from a weak eluent composition to a stronger one. Based on linear solvent strength theory (LSST) of gradient elution for reversed phase chromatography, the relationship between retention time, instrumental variables and solute parameters is shown below.

t_{R}=t_{0} +t_{D} + t_{0}/b*ln(b*(k_{0}-t_{d}/t_{0}) + 1)

While a lot of pioneering work has been completed in the years since 2D-LC became a major analytical chromatographic technique, there are still many modern problems to be considered. Large amounts of experimental variables have yet to be decided on, and the technique is constantly in a state of development.

=== Gas chromatography – gas chromatography ===
Comprehensive two-dimensional gas chromatography is an analytical technique that separates and analyzes complex mixtures. It has been utilized in fields such as: flavor, fragrance, environmental studies, pharmaceuticals, petroleum products and forensic science. GCxGC provides a high range of sensitivity and produces a greater separation power due to the increased peak capacity.

== See also ==
- Two-dimensional gel electrophoresis
