= Lyman C. Craig =

Chemical researcher

Lyman C. Craig (born 1906 in Palmyra Township, Warren County, Iowa; died 1974) was a chemical researcher who worked at The Rockefeller Institute for Medical Research from 1933 onward. In 1944 he published a seminal work on countercurrent distribution, which became an important separation technique. Craig continued to develop the theory, improve the apparatus and devise new applications of the countercurrent distribution into the 1970s. Countercurrent distribution not only proved to be a useful separation technique, it also inspired the development of the field of countercurrent chromatography. In 1950, Craig invented the rotary evaporator which is a necessary equipment in most chemical labs. He also invented the Craig tube, an apparatus used in small-scale chemistry, in particular for recrystallization. He received recognition from his peers and several honors for his scientific accomplishments. He was elected to the National Academy of Sciences in 1950. He was the recipient of the 1963 Albert Lasker Award for Basic Medical Research. He also was nominated for the Nobel Prize in Chemistry.
