= Anthony T. James =

British chemist (1922–2006)

Anthony Trafford James (6 March 1922 – 7 December 2006) was a British chemist. He came to scientific prominence in the early 1950s for co-inventing the gas chromatograph with Archer Martin at the National Institute for Medical Research in London. James was a Fellow of the Royal Society.

== See also ==
- List of chemists
