= Walter Podbielniak =

Walter Joseph Podbielniak (1899–1978), known as 'Dr Pod' was an American chemist, chemical engineer, and inventor of centrifugal devices for distillation and liquid-liquid contacting used in the petroleum industry and the production of penicillin.

== Life ==
Podbielniak was born Władisław Josef Podbielniak March 13, 1899, to Polish immigrant parents in Buffalo, New York, and graduated in Analytical Chemistry at Buffalo University in 1920. He first worked as an analytical chemist for the National Aniline and Chemical Company, then went to study chemical engineering at the University of Michigan, receiving a BSc in 1923. He stayed on to do research on distillation in association with Phillips Petroleum Company, earning a PhD entitled Vaporization of Complex Mixtures in 1928.

On June 18, 1928, he married chemist Władzia Gajda.

His PhD equipment was the basis for a commercial analytical device to fractionate petroleum, which he patented, and he and his wife sold to the expanding petroleum industry. Two models covered low (–180 to +100 °C) and high temperature (0 to +300 °C). In 1934, they set up a company Podbielniak Inc. to sell them and offer analytical and consultancy services. They produced automatic versions of their fractionator, and expanded into analytical gas chromatography. For the low temperature fractional distillation apparatus, Podbielniak received the Hanlon Award of the National Gasoline Association of America in 1951, which was said to be "the most valuable single tool in the analysis of gas and liquid hydrocarbons ... familiarly known as the ‘Pod column’ in practically every oil company plant and laboratory,"

In the 1930s they published a series of patents for centrifugal devices for both fractional distillation and for liquid-liquid extraction. The Podbielniak Contactor for liquid-liquid extraction was particularly successful and important in the production of penicillin during World War II.

In 1961 Podbielniak Inc. was taken over by Dresser Industries

In 1959 the couple divorced, and in 1966 he married Nancy Bruce.

He died 13 December 1978 in Rancho Santa Fe, California.
