= Radial chromatography =

Radial chromatography is a form of chromatography, a preparatory technique for separating chemical mixtures. It can also be referred to as centrifugal thin-layer chromatography. It is a common technique for isolating compounds and can be compared to column chromatography as a similar process. A common device used for this technique is a Chromatotron.

Here the solvent travels from the center of the circular chromatography silica layered on a plate towards the periphery. The entire system is kept covered in order to prevent evaporation of solvent while developing a chromatogram.

The wick at the center of system drips solvent into the system which the provides the mobile phase and moves the sample radially to form the sample spots of different compounds as concentric rings.

Continuous annular chromatography uses a stationary phase which is filled into an annular gap. The eluent is continuously fed across the whole bed interface also the feed is continuously fed at the top of the stationary however only at a certain point and not a cross the whole bed. The stationary phase is then rotated with a certain rotation speed. The rotation speed, eluent and feed flow rates have to be defined precisely such that the collector vessels only collect the correct substance. The retention times are transformed into the respective retention angles.
