= Richard Laurence Millington Synge =

British biochemist (1914–1994)

Richard Laurence Millington Synge FRS FRSE FRIC FRSC
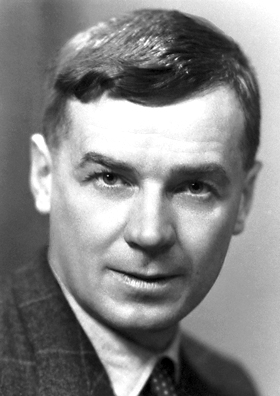
- Born: 28 October 1914; Liverpool, England
- Died: 18 August 1994 (aged 79); Norwich, England
- Education: Winchester College; Trinity College, Cambridge
- Known for: Paper chromatography Partition chromatography
- Awards: FRS (1950); Nobel Prize in Chemistry (1952); John Price Wetherill Medal (1959)
- Scientific career
- Fields: biochemist

Richard Laurence Millington Synge (28 October 1914 – 18 August 1994) was an English biochemist, and shared the 1952 Nobel Prize in Chemistry for the invention of partition chromatography with Archer Martin.

== Life ==
Richard Laurence Millington Synge was born in West Kirby on 28 October 1914, the son of Lawrence Millington Synge, a Liverpool stock-broker, and his wife, Katherine C. Swan.

Synge was educated at the Old Hall in Wellington, Shropshire and at Winchester College. He then studied Chemistry at Trinity College, Cambridge.

He spent his entire career in research, at the Wool Industries Research Association, Leeds (1941–1943), Lister Institute for Preventive Medicine, London (1943–1948), Rowett Research Institute, Aberdeen (1948–1967), and Food Research Institute, Norwich (1967–1976).

It was during his time in Leeds that he worked with Archer Martin, developing partition chromatography, a technique used in the separation mixtures of similar chemicals, that revolutionised analytical chemistry. Between 1942 and 1948 he studied peptides of the protein group gramicidin, work later used by Frederick Sanger in determining the structure of insulin. In March 1950 he was elected a Fellow of the Royal Society for which his candidature citation read:

Distinguished as a biochemist. Was the first to show the possibility of using counter-current liquid-liquid extraction in the separation of N-acetylamino acids. In collaboration with A.J.P. Martin this led to the development of partition chromatography, which they have applied with conspicuous success in problems related to the composition and structure of proteins, particularly wool keratin. Synge's recent work on the composition and structure of gramicidins is outstanding and illustrates vividly the great advances in technique for which he and Martin are responsible.

— "Library and Archive catalogue". Royal Society. Archived from the original on 27 July 2011.

In 1963 he was elected a Fellow of the Royal Society of Edinburgh. His proposers were Magnus Pyke, Andrew Phillipson, Sir David Cuthbertson and John Andrew Crichton.

He was for several years the treasurer of the Chemical Information Group of the Royal Society of Chemistry, and was an honorary Professor in Biological Sciences at the University of East Anglia from 1968 to 1984. He was awarded an honorary Doctor of Science (ScD) from the University of East Anglia in 1977, and an honorary doctorate from the Faculty of Mathematics and Science at Uppsala University, Sweden in 1980.

== Personal life ==
In 1943 Synge married Ann Davies Stephen (1916–1997). Ann Stephen was the daughter of psychologist Karin Stephen and psychoanalyst Adrian Stephen. Ann's sister Judith (1918–1972) was married to documentary artist and photographer Nigel Henderson.

== See also ==
- Monolithic HPLC column
