= Archer Martin =

British chemist (1910–2002)

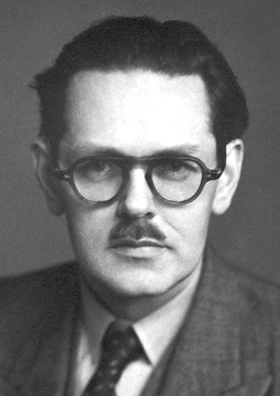
- Born: Archer John Porter Martin; 1 March 1910; London, England
- Died: 28 July 2002 (aged 92); Llangarron, Herefordshire, England
- Education: Peterhouse, Cambridge
- Known for: Gas chromatography Paper chromatography Partition chromatography
- Spouse: Judith Bagenal (m. 1943)
- Children: 5
- Awards: Nobel Prize in Chemistry (1952); John Price Wetherill Medal (1959); Leverhulme Medal (1963)
- Scientific career
- Fields: Chemistry
- Workplaces: University of Sussex, University of Houston in Texas, EPFL

Archer John Porter Martin CBE FRS (1 March 1910 – 28 July 2002) was an English chemist who shared the 1952 Nobel Prize in Chemistry for the invention of partition chromatography with Richard Synge.

== Early life ==
Martin's father was a GP. Martin was educated at Bedford School, and Peterhouse, Cambridge.

== Career ==
Working first in the Physical Chemistry Laboratory, he moved to the Dunn Nutritional Laboratory, and in 1938 moved to Wool Industries Research Institution in Leeds. He was head of the biochemistry division of Boots Pure Drug Company from 1946 to 1948, when he joined the Medical Research Council. There, he was appointed head of the physical chemistry division of the National Institute for Medical Research in 1952, and was chemical consultant from 1956 to 1959.

He specialised in biochemistry, in some aspects of vitamins E and B_{2}, and in techniques that laid the foundation for several new types of chromatography. He developed partition chromatography whilst working on the separation of amino acids, and later developed gas-liquid chromatography with Anthony T. James. Amongst many honours, he received his Nobel Prize in 1952.

After his retirement from the University of Sussex, he was visiting professor at both the University of Houston in Texas and the EPFL (École Polytechnique Fédérale de Lausanne) in Switzerland.

He published far fewer papers than the typical Nobel winners—only 70 in all—but his ninth paper contained the work that would eventually win him the Nobel Prize. The University of Houston dropped him from its chemistry faculty in 1979 (when he was 69 years old) because he was not publishing enough.

== Awards ==
Archer Martin shared the 1952 Nobel Prize in Chemistry for the invention of partition chromatography with Richard Synge.

Archer Martin's 1954 paper with Anthony T. James, "Gas-Liquid Chromatography: A Technique for the Analysis and Identification of Volatile Materials" reported the discovery of gas-liquid chromatography. This was performed at the National Institute for Medical Research in Mill Hill, London, which became the Francis Crick Institute in 2016. It was honoured by a Citation for Chemical Breakthrough Award from the Division of History of Chemistry of the American Chemical Society presented in 2016 to the Francis Crick Institute.

Martin was elected a Fellow of the Royal Society in 1950, and made a CBE in 1960.

== Personal life ==
In 1943 he married Judith Bagenal (1918–2006), and together they had two sons and three daughters. In the last years of his life he suffered from Alzheimer's disease.
