= Countercurrent distribution =

Countercurrent distribution (CCD, also spelled "counter current" distribution) is an analytical chemistry technique which was developed by Lyman C. Craig in the 1940s. Countercurrent distribution is a separation process that is founded on the principles of liquid–liquid extraction where a chemical compound is distributed (partitioned) between two immiscible liquid phases (oil and water for example) according to its relative solubility in the two phases. The simplest form of liquid-liquid extraction is the partitioning of a mixture of compounds between two immiscible liquid phases in a separatory funnel. This occurs in five steps: 1) preparation of the separatory funnel with the two phase solvent system, 2) introduction of the compound mixture into the separatory funnel, 3) vigorous shaking of the separatory funnel to mix the two layers and allow for mass transfer of compounds in and out of the phases, 4) The contents of the separatory funnel are allowed to settle back into two distinct phases and 5) the two phases are separated from each other by draining out the bottom phase. If a compound is insoluble in the lower phase it will distribute into the upper phase and stay in the separatory funnel. If a compound is insoluble in the upper phase it will distribute into the lower phase and be removed from the separatory funnel. If the mixture contains one or more compounds that are soluble in the upper phase and one or more compounds that are soluble in the lower phase, then an extraction has occurred. Often, an individual compound is soluble to a certain extent in both phases and the extraction is, therefore, incomplete. The relative solubility of a compound in two phases is known as the partition coefficient.

While one separatory funnel is useful in separating certain compound mixtures with a carefully formulated biphasic solvent system, a series of separatory funnels may be employed to separate compounds that have different partition coefficients. Countercurrent distribution, therefore, is a method of using a series of vessels (separatory funnels) to separate compounds by a sequence of liquid-liquid extraction operations. Contrary to liquid-liquid extraction, in the CCD instruments the upper phase is decanted from the lower phase once the phases have settled. First, a mixture is introduced to vessel 1 (V_{1}) charged with both phases and the liquid-liquid extraction process is performed. The upper phase is added to a second vessel (V_{2}) which already holds fresh lower phase. Fresh upper phase is added to V_{1}. Both vessels are shaken and allowed to settle. upper phase from V_{1} is transferred to V_{2} at the same time the upper phase from V_{2} is transferred to V_{3} which already holds fresh lower phase. Fresh upper phase is added to V_{1}, all three vessels are shaken and settled and the process continues. Compounds that are more soluble in the upper phase than lower phase travel faster and farther down the series of vessels (the "train") while those compounds which are more soluble in the lower phase than the upper phase tend to lag behind. A compound insoluble in the upper phase will remain in V_{1} while a compound insoluble in the lower phase will stay in the lead vessel.

== Historical development ==
Early work in the development of liquid-liquid separation techniques was undertaken by Cornish et al. with a process called "systematic fractional distribution" as well as Randall and Longtin, however, the central figure is certainly Lyman C. Craig. Lyman Craig's development of countercurrent distribution began with studying the distribution of a pharmaceutical, mepacrine (atabrine), between the two layers of an ethylene dichloride, methanol, and aqueous buffer biphasic solvent system. The distribution coefficient (K_{c} which coincides with partition coefficient) of atabrine varied by the composition of the solvent system and the pH of the buffer. In the next article, Craig was inspired by the work of Martin and Synge with partition chromatography to develop an apparatus that would separate compounds based on their distribution constant (K which coincides with partition coefficient). It was shown that a solvent system composed of benzene, n-hexane, methanol and water would separate mixtures of organic acids. It is remarkable that the mathematical theory developed hand-in-hand with the progression of applications. Craig continued to pursue this method of separation by testing different compounds, formulating biphasic solvent systems, and most importantly developing a commercially viable instrument.

The CCD technique was employed in many notable separations such as penicillin, polycyclic aromatic hydrocarbons, insulin, bile acids, ribonucleic acids, taxol, Streptomyces antibiotics. and many other antibiotics.
