= Poly-N-(3-sulfopropyl)aniline =

Water-soluble self-doped conducting polyaniline derivative

Poly(N-3-sulfopropylaniline)

Names
- IUPAC name poly[N-(3-sulfopropyl)aniline]
- Other names PSPA; PSPANa (sodium salt form); polyAnPS; poly(aniline-N-propanesulfonic acid)

Identifiers

Properties
Chemical formula	(C_{9}H_{11}NO_{3}S)_{n}
Molar mass	~8,100 g/mol (M_{w}, by GPC in DMF)
Appearance	Green solid (emeraldine salt); blue solid (emeraldine base/sodium salt)
Solubility in water	Soluble in water, DMSO, NMP, pyridine, THF (emeraldine salt form); insoluble in methanol, acetone, hydrocarbons
- Except where otherwise noted, data are given for materials in their standard state (at 25 °C [77 °F], 100 kPa). Infobox references

Poly(N-3-sulfopropylaniline) (PSPA) is a water-soluble, self-doped conducting polymer belonging to the polyaniline family. It is produced by oxidative polymerization of the monomer N-(3-sulfopropyl)aniline (SPA). PSPA differs from unsubstituted polyaniline (PANI) in that each repeat unit carries a pendant –(CH_{2})_{3}–SO_{3}H group covalently attached to nitrogen, which acts as an internal dopant (self-doping), conferring water solubility and electroactivity across a wider pH range than PANI.

PSPA and its copolymers have been investigated for applications in colorimetric biosensors, amperometric sensors, tissue engineering scaffolds, nanocomposite electrode materials, and aqueous redox flow batteries.

== Oxidation states ==
Like unsubstituted polyaniline, PSPA exists in three principal redox forms:

- Emeraldine salt (PSPA): the green-colored, partially oxidized, conducting form obtained directly from oxidative polymerization. The polymer is self-doped by the pendant sulfonic acid groups acting as internal dopants.
- Emeraldine base / sodium salt (PSPANa): the blue-colored, dedoped form obtained by treatment with sodium hydroxide or sodium carbonate. The sulfonic acid groups are converted to sodium sulfonates (–SO_{3}Na) and the backbone acquires a quinoid-rich structure. Four-probe conductivity drops to approximately 6 × 10^{−5} S/cm.
- Leucoemeraldine base: the colorless, fully reduced form generated by the action of reducing agents such as ascorbic acid or cysteine on PSPANa.

The transition between the emeraldine salt and emeraldine base forms occurs over the pH range 8.6–9.6, producing a visually sharp green-to-blue color change that is exploited in colorimetric sensing.

== Synthesis ==
=== Monomer ===
The monomer N-(3-sulfopropyl)aniline (SPA) is prepared by ring-opening addition of 1,3-propanesultone to excess aniline.

=== Chemical oxidative polymerization ===
PSPA is prepared by oxidative polymerization of SPA in aqueous solution using ammonium persulfate (APS) as oxidant, at 0–30 °C, for 2–24 hours. The reaction can be carried out in pure water without added acid, as the reduction of persulfate during polymerization provides sufficient acidification (pH drops to approximately 0.4 in a 0.2 M SPA solution). In the presence of 1 M HCl, additional doping occurs, yielding higher conductivity. The emerald-green polymer is isolated by precipitation into acetone, filtered, washed with acetone, and dried under vacuum at 50–70 °C.

An alternative protocol uses 1.2 M HCl as solvent, with a [SPA]:[APS] molar ratio of 1:1, polymerization at 0–5 °C for 5 h followed by overnight aging at 4 °C, and purification by dialysis (1 kDa MWCO membrane, 48 h against pH 3 water) to remove monomer completely, as verified by thin-layer chromatography. Lyophilization yields a green solid (yield ~40%).

Molecular weight determined by gel permeation chromatography in DMF: M_{w} ≈ 8,100 g/mol, M_{n} ≈ 6,500 g/mol, dispersity ≈ 1.25, corresponding to a degree of polymerization of approximately 31 repeat units. MALDI-TOF analysis shows peaks at mass intervals of ~213 Da, consistent with the repeat unit C_{9}H_{11}NO_{3}S. In samples purified by dialysis, chains of up to 11 repeat units are detected, with the most abundant chain containing 6 units (peak at 1266 Da); from these spectra M_{n} = 1335 g/mol, M_{w} = 1404 g/mol, and dispersity Đ = 1.05. Longer chains (7–31 units) are observed in samples isolated by precipitation without dialysis.

The sodium salt (PSPANa) is obtained by treating an aqueous PSPA solution with 5 M NaOH solution, precipitating the resulting blue polymer with methanol, and drying under vacuum.

=== Electrochemical polymerization ===
SPA and its mixtures with aniline can be polymerized electrochemically on electrode surfaces by cyclic voltammetry between −0.2 and 0.85 V (vs. Ag/AgCl) in aqueous sulfuric acid. Sequential deposition (polyaniline first, then SPA) and copolymerization from mixed solutions have both been described.

== Properties ==
=== Solubility ===
The emeraldine salt (PSPA) is soluble in water, DMSO, NMP, pyridine, and THF, and insoluble in methanol, acetone, and aliphatic or aromatic hydrocarbons. It is also soluble in aqueous base (NaOH, NH_{4}OH), giving red-violet solutions characteristic of the dedoped form. The homopolymer is hygroscopic and retains water from synthesis. In 1.2 M HCl, quantitative determination by UV–visible calibration gives a solubility of 150 mM in monomer units (~3 g/L, corresponding to a theoretical volume-specific capacity of 2010 mAh/L).

=== Thermal stability ===
Thermogravimetric analysis (TGA, nitrogen atmosphere) shows a first weight loss below 100–120 °C (moisture), a major loss at 200–400 °C attributed to scission of the alkyl sulfonate group and degradation of the backbone, and further decomposition at higher temperatures. The thermal stability follows the order PSPA < SPA < PSPANa; conversion of the acid to the sodium salt improves thermal stability.

=== Crystallinity ===
Wide-angle X-ray diffraction (WXRD) shows a sharp peak at 2θ ≈ 4–5° (d-spacing ~17–21 Å) attributed to lamellar ordering of polymer chains through ionic interactions between pendant sulfonate anions and imine nitrogen atoms of adjacent chains, resulting in a partially crystalline structure.

=== Self-assembly in solution ===
Dynamic light scattering (DLS) in aqueous solution reveals nanoaggregates of 8–10 nm with a zeta potential of approximately −20 to −30 mV (PSPA) and −22.5 mV (PSPANa). The amphiphilic character of PSPA (hydrophobic aromatic backbone, hydrophilic sulfonate groups) drives formation of these nanomicellar aggregates in water. The critical micellar concentration (CMC) is approximately 4 × 10^{−4} M.

== Spectroscopic characterization ==
=== UV–visible absorption ===
Form	Absorption bands (nm)	Assignment
PSPA (emeraldine salt, green)	~305–320	π–π* transition (benzenoid rings)
	~415–430	polaron–π* transition
	>850 (broad)	bipolaron / delocalized polaron transition
PSPANa (emeraldine base, blue)	~290–300	π–π* transition
	~580–640	excitonic quinoid ring transition

Upon addition of reducing analytes such as ascorbic acid or cysteine to PSPANa, the absorption at 608–640 nm disappears as the polymer is reduced to the colorless leucoemeraldine form.

=== NMR spectroscopy ===
The ^{1}H NMR spectrum of PSPA (emeraldine salt, D_{2}O) shows aromatic signals at δ 7.46 (m, 3H) and 7.37 (d, 2H), and aliphatic signals at δ 3.48 (t, 2H, –NH–CH_{2}–), 2.90 (t, 2H, –CH_{2}–SO_{3}H), and 2.00 (t, 2H, central –CH_{2}–). In PSPANa, the aromatic protons shift to δ 6.77 (t, 2H, benzenoid) and 6.40 (d, 4H, quinoid), with loss of the N–H signals and appearance of quinoid ring protons at δ 6.21–6.63 ppm. When APS is used as oxidant, additional singlet peaks at δ 7.00, 7.12, and 7.25 ppm have been assigned to residual NH_{4}^{+} cations from the oxidant.

=== Infrared spectroscopy ===
Key absorptions (KBr pellet): 1575–1600 cm^{−1} (C=C, quinoid rings), 1490–1510 cm^{−1} (C=C, benzenoid rings), 1350–1401 cm^{−1} (C–N stretching), 1140–1176 cm^{−1} (O=S=O asymmetric stretching), 1033–1045 cm^{−1} (O=S=O symmetric stretching), 807–821 cm^{−1} (C–H out-of-plane bending, 1,4-disubstituted benzene).

=== Cyclic voltammetry ===
In aqueous solution at pH ~12 (NaOH/Na_{2}CO_{3} as electrolyte), PSPANa shows an anodic peak at approximately +0.46 V and a reversible cathodic peak at approximately −0.21 V (vs. Ag/AgCl). Addition of ascorbic acid or cysteine causes the disappearance of the cathodic peak, consistent with reduction of the polymer by the analyte.

In 1.2 M HCl, PSPA exhibits three overlapping redox processes at approximately 0.33, 0.45, and 0.56 V (vs. Ag/AgCl), as resolved by square-wave voltammetry. By analogy with unsubstituted polyaniline, the process at 0.33 V is assigned to the leucoemeraldine/emeraldine couple and the process at 0.56 V to the emeraldine/pernigraniline couple; the intermediate peak at ~0.45 V has been attributed to end-group redox processes of the short PSPA chains. At multiple scan rates (0.01–1.00 V s^{−1}), the peak potential separation ΔE_{p} for the emeraldine/pernigraniline couple ranges from 102 to 160 mV, and the anodic-to-cathodic peak current ratio i_{pa}/i_{pc} < 1 at all scan rates, indicating a quasi-reversible process.

UV–visible spectroelectrochemistry (1 mM PSPA in 1.2 M HCl, applied potentials 200–700 mV vs. Ag/AgCl) shows that potentials ≤300 mV yield the emeraldine spectrum (bands at 318, 421, and 1065 nm). As potential increases, a broad band centered at ~771 nm grows, assigned to the transition through the Peierls gap band of the pernigraniline form. At 700 mV a band below 300 nm confirms formation of pernigraniline.

== Electrical conductivity ==
Four-probe measurements on pressed pellets of PSPA give conductivity values of approximately 3–4 × 10^{−3} S/cm (emeraldine salt, self-doped form). The dedoped sodium salt (PSPANa) shows conductivity of approximately 6 × 10^{−5} S/cm. Copolymers of SPA with increasing aniline content reach conductivities up to 0.053 S/cm. In PSPA/V_{2}O_{5} nanocomposites, conductivity values up to 1.2 × 10^{−2} S/cm have been reported after aging.

== Morphology ==
Chemical oxidative polymerization of SPA produces a flake-like (two-dimensional platelet) solid-state morphology rather than the one-dimensional fibrous morphology typical of unsubstituted polyaniline. This is attributed to strong interchain ionic interactions between pendant sulfonate groups of adjacent chains, which promote lateral two-dimensional growth. In scanning electron microscopy (SEM), PSPA films prepared by drop-casting show plate-like aggregates of 100–200 µm composed of smaller irregular particles.

== Copolymers and derivatives ==
=== Copolymers with aniline ===
Random and block copolymers of SPA with aniline (poly(aniline-co-AnPS), PANi-co-PANs) have been described with compositions ranging from fully water-soluble (sulfonate-rich) to water-insoluble, semiconducting (aniline-rich). A homologous series of block copolymers prepared by sequential addition of SPA to an ongoing aniline polymerization shows systematically tunable dc-conductivity (from ~10^{−10} to ~10^{−4} S/cm), solubility, and interfacial activity as a function of the polyaniline block length.

=== Copolymers with phenylenediamines ===
Random copolymerization of SPA with ortho-, meta-, or para-phenylenediamine yields water-dispersible submicron spheres (diameter 0.6–1.5 µm), with the SPA component improving the poor aqueous dispersibility of the phenylenediamine homopolymers.

=== Graphene oxide composites ===
Graft polymerization of SPA from persulfate-activated aminophenyl-functionalized graphene oxide (GO-AP) yields water-soluble GO composites (GO-AP-PANPrSO_{3}H) confirmed by Raman spectroscopy, DSC, and SEM. These composites display dual photoluminescence (from the polymer chain at ~404 nm and from the GO component at ~518 nm upon different excitation wavelengths) and undergo electrochemical oxidation of the polymer backbone alongside reduction of carbonyl groups of the GO component.

=== V_{2}O_{5} nanocomposites ===
In situ intercalation and polymerization of SPA within vanadium pentoxide (V_{2}O_{5}) xerogel yields PSPA/V_{2}O_{5} nanocomposites in which the interlayer spacing of V_{2}O_{5} expands from 1.18 to 1.31 nm. These materials have been investigated as cathode materials for rechargeable lithium batteries.

== Electrochemical transport parameters ==
The diffusion coefficient of PSPA in aqueous solution (pH 3, Milli-Q water) was determined by surface plasmon resonance (SPR) spectroscopy as D = 4.6 × 10^{−6} cm^{2} s^{−1}. The apparent diffusion coefficient D_{app}, measured electrochemically via the Randles–Ševčík equation from the scan-rate dependence of the emeraldine/pernigraniline peak current, is D_{app} = 1.7 × 10^{−6} cm^{2} s^{−1} in 1.2 M HCl. The agreement D > D_{app} is consistent with Dahms–Ruff theory, which predicts that at low concentrations the electron-hopping contribution D_{EX} is negligible and D_{app} ≈ D. The standard heterogeneous rate constant on glassy carbon is k^{0} = 2.0 × 10^{−3} cm s^{−1}, determined by the Nicholson method.

== Applications ==
=== Colorimetric sensing of biomolecules ===
PSPANa (the blue sodium salt of PSPA) has been reported as a substrate for naked-eye colorimetric sensing of reducing biomolecules, exploiting the blue-to-colorless transition that accompanies reduction of the quinoid backbone to leucoemeraldine. The response to ascorbic acid and cysteine is selective over other amino acids and water-soluble vitamins under the reported conditions. The analyte-to-polymer stoichiometry has been determined as 3:2 (vitamin C) and 4:1 (cysteine) by Job's method, and association constants of K = 2.1 × 10^{3} M^{−1} (vitamin C) and 1.5 × 10^{3} M^{−1} (cysteine) have been reported using the Benesi–Hildebrand method.

PSPANa has also been reported to detect glucose by UV–visible absorption spectroscopy, with a stated detection limit of 10^{−9} M under the reported conditions. The polymer does not distinguish between reducing sugars under those conditions.

=== Amperometric sensors ===
Copolymer films of SPA and aniline deposited electrochemically on glassy carbon or dual band electrodes function as amperometric sensors for ascorbate at physiological pH (7.2). A wall-jet flow cell incorporating a sequentially polymerized electrode achieved a detection limit of 2.2 µM for ascorbate at 0 mV vs. Ag/AgCl, with no interference from uric acid or dopamine under the reported conditions.

=== Redox flow batteries ===
PSPA has been proposed as an aqueous catholyte for redox flow batteries (RFBs), exploiting its water solubility and the electrochemically reversible emeraldine/pernigraniline couple (E° ≈ 0.56 V vs. Ag/AgCl). Its theoretical gravimetric capacity is 62.3 mAh g^{−1} (n = 0.5 electrons per monomer unit, M = 215.27 g mol^{−1}), and its theoretical volumetric capacity at 150 mM is 2010 mAh L^{−1}.

An all-aqueous cell was assembled using 100 mM PSPA in 1.2 M HCl as catholyte and 25 mM anthraquinone-2-sulfonic acid (AQS) in 1.2 M HCl as anolyte, separated by a cation exchange membrane (CXM-200), with graphite felt electrodes. The open-circuit cell voltage is ~0.53 V. At 1C rate, the cell delivers a discharging specific capacity of ~788 mAh L^{−1} with average Coulombic efficiency of 52% over 10 cycles; at 2C rate, ~392 mAh L^{−1} with 73% Coulombic efficiency over 25 cycles before capacity decline.

Capacity fading was found to result primarily from the hydrolysis of the oxidized (pernigraniline) form of PSPA. The imine groups in pernigraniline undergo nucleophilic attack by water, producing p-benzoquinone (p-BQ) and a homotaurine derivative as degradation products. Neutral p-BQ, unlike the anionic PSPA chains, permeates the cation-exchange membrane into the anolyte compartment, reducing cell capacity and Coulombic efficiency. Formation of p-BQ during cycling was confirmed by UV–visible spectroscopy and post-mortem cyclic voltammetry of both compartments. Proposed strategies to improve stability include use of organic solvents or ionic liquids to inhibit hydrolysis, high ionic-strength aqueous media to reduce water activity, and synthetic modifications to the aromatic ring to hinder imine hydrolysis.

=== Tissue engineering ===
Sulfonated polyaniline materials chemically analogous to PSPA—synthesized from SPA and potassium persulfate and incorporated as ionically conductive coatings on electrospun polycaprolactone/cellulose acetate fiber matrices—have been studied for peripheral nerve regeneration applications. In vitro, electrical stimulation (0.5 V, 20 Hz, 1 h/day for 14 days) of human mesenchymal stem cells seeded on these composite scaffolds was associated with morphological changes toward neurite-like structures and expression of neuronal markers (β3-tubulin, MAP2, nestin) in comparison to unstimulated controls.

== See also ==
- Polyaniline
- N-(3-Sulfopropyl)aniline
- Conducting polymers
- Redox flow battery
