= N-(3-Sulfopropyl)aniline =

Chemical compound

Names
- IUPAC name 3-(phenylamino)propane-1-sulfonic acid
- Other names: Aniline-N-propanesulfonic acid; AnPS; N-3-sulfopropylaniline; SPA

Identifiers
CAS Number	72943-20-5
3D model (JSmol)	Interactive image
ChemSpider	2285932
EC Number	277-117-0
PubChem CID	3018384
- InChI: Key: NYLUYMWPXIIXDX-UHFFFAOYSA-N; InChI=1S/C9H13NO3S/c11-14(12,13)8-4-7-10-9-5-2-1-3-6-9/h1-3,5-6,10H,4,7-8H2,(H,11,12,13)
- SMILES: O=S(=O)(CCCNC1=CC=CC=C1)O

Properties
Chemical formula	C_{9}H_{13}NO_{3}S
Molar mass	215.27 g/mol
Appearance	White crystalline solid
Melting point	241 to 244 °C (466 to 471 °F; 514 to 517 K)
Solubility in water	Soluble
Solubility	Soluble in methanol

Hazards
- GHS labelling
Pictograms	(GHS07: Exclamation mark)
Signal word	Warning
Hazard statements	H302, H315, H319, H335
Precautionary statements	P261, P264, P264+P265, P270, P271, P280, P301+P317, P302+P352, P304+P340, P305+P351+P338, P319, P321, P330, P332+P317, P337+P317, P362+P364, P403+P233, P405, P501
- Except where otherwise noted, data are given for materials in their standard state (at 25 °C [77 °F], 100 kPa). Infobox references

N-(3-Sulfopropyl)aniline (SPA, also AnPS) is an organic compound with the molecular formula C_{9}H_{13}NO_{3}S. It is an aniline derivative in which the nitrogen atom bears a 3-propane sulfonic acid group (–(CH_{2})_{3}–SO_{3}H), introduced by ring opening of 1,3-propanesultone. SPA is primarily used as a monomer in the synthesis of poly(N-3-sulfopropylaniline) (PSPA), a water-soluble, self-doped member of the polyaniline family of conducting polymers.

== Synthesis ==
SPA is prepared by the ring-opening addition of 1,3-propanesultone to aniline under mild conditions, without catalyst or inert atmosphere protection. The reaction is carried out by adding the sultone dropwise to excess aniline at room temperature; the product precipitates as a white solid, which is isolated by filtration, washed with acetone, and purified by recrystallization from hot methanol. Typical reported yields are 87–95%.

An alternative procedure uses acetonitrile as solvent at 100 °C for 11 hours, with the product recrystallized from ethanol (yield ~87%). Ethanol has also been used as solvent at 60 °C for 24 hours. The use of excess aniline suppresses bis-alkylation at the nitrogen atom.

== Spectroscopic characterization ==
=== NMR spectroscopy ===
In D_{2}O, the ^{1}H NMR spectrum of SPA shows signals attributed to five distinct proton environments. Aromatic protons appear at δ 7.59 (t, 2H, Ar-H), 7.53 (t, 1H, Ar-H), and 7.46 (d, 2H, Ar-H); aliphatic protons appear at δ 3.60 (t, 2H, –NH–CH_{2}–), 3.03 (t, 2H, –CH_{2}–SO_{3}H), and 2.19 (q, 2H, central –CH_{2}–), consistent with the monosubstituted structure. The ^{13}C NMR spectrum (D_{2}O) shows signals at δ 134.5, 130.4, 129.9, 122.3 (aromatic carbons), 50.2, 47.7, and 20.9 (aliphatic carbons).

=== Infrared spectroscopy ===
The FT-IR spectrum (KBr pellet) shows characteristic absorptions at 1594 and 1472 cm^{−1} (aromatic C=C stretching), 1168 and 1045 cm^{−1} (O=S=O asymmetric and symmetric stretching), and 3400–3500 cm^{−1} (N–H stretching). The S/N atomic molar ratio of 1, confirmed by X-ray photoelectron spectroscopy, is consistent with a single sulfonate group per nitrogen atom.

=== UV–visible spectroscopy ===
In 1.2 M HCl, SPA shows UV absorption at λ = 208 nm (ε = 4218 M^{−1}·cm^{−1}) and λ = 254 nm (ε = 217 M^{−1}·cm^{−1}). The absorption at 254 nm is characteristic of the phenyl chromophore of monosubstituted anilines.

=== Mass spectrometry ===
FAB high-resolution mass spectrometry gives m/z 214.65 (M^{+}), in agreement with the calculated monoisotopic mass for C_{9}H_{13}NO_{3}S.

== Polymerization ==
SPA undergoes oxidative polymerization in aqueous solution using ammonium persulfate as oxidant to give poly(N-3-sulfopropylaniline) (PSPA). The polymerization proceeds in pure water without added acid, as the acidification produced by the persulfate reduction is sufficient to initiate and sustain the reaction. The resulting polymer is soluble in water and is self-doped by its own pendant sulfonate groups.

SPA also undergoes electrochemical polymerization on electrode surfaces in acidic aqueous media. Sequential electropolymerization of aniline followed by SPA, and direct copolymerization from mixed solutions, have been reported as routes to films with improved electroactivity at neutral pH relative to unmodified polyaniline.

== Applications ==
=== Precursor to conducting polymers ===
SPA is the principal monomer for the synthesis of PSPA and its copolymers with aniline, phenylenediamine isomers, and other monomers. These materials are used in electrochemical sensors, biosensors, and electrode modification.

=== Electrode modification ===
Films of poly(aniline-co-SPA) deposited by sequential or co-electropolymerization on glassy carbon electrodes function as amperometric sensors for ascorbate at physiological pH, with detection limits reported as low as 2.2 µM. Dopamine and uric acid do not interfere under the reported conditions.

=== Nanocomposites ===
SPA can be intercalated into vanadium pentoxide (V_{2}O_{5}) xerogel and polymerized in situ by V_{2}O_{5} acting as oxidant in the presence of air, yielding PSPA/V_{2}O_{5} nanocomposites with enhanced electrical conductivity compared to either component alone. Such composites have been investigated as cathode materials for rechargeable lithium batteries.

=== Redox flow batteries ===
PSPA derived from SPA has been investigated as an aqueous catholyte in aqueous organic redox flow batteries, exploiting the polymer's water solubility, electroactivity across a wide pH range, and the reversible redox chemistry of the polyaniline backbone.

== See also ==
- Polyaniline
- Conducting polymers
- 1,3-Propanesultone
- Poly-N-(3-sulfopropyl)aniline
