= Chiral column chromatography =

Chemical separation technique

Chiral column chromatography is a variant of column chromatography that is employed for the separation of chiral compounds, i.e. enantiomers, in mixtures such as racemates or related compounds. The chiral stationary phase (CSP) is made of a support, usually silica based, on which a chiral reagent or a macromolecule with numerous chiral centers is bonded or immobilized.

The chiral stationary phase can be prepared by attaching a chiral compound to the surface of an achiral support such as silica gel. For example, one class of the most commonly used chiral stationary phases both in liquid chromatography and supercritical fluid chromatography is based on oligosaccharides such as amylose, cellulose, or cyclodextrin (in particular with β-cyclodextrin, a seven sugar ring molecule) immobilized on silica gel.

The principle can be also applied to the fabrication of Monolithic HPLC columns or Gas Chromatography columns. or Supercritical Fluid Chromatography columns.

== Principle of chiral column chromatography ==
The chiral stationary phase, CSP, can interact differently with two enantiomers, by a process known as chiral recognition. Chiral recognition depends on various interactions such as hydrogen bonding, π-π interaction, dipole stacking, inclusion complexation, steric, hydrophobic and electrostatic interaction, charge-transfer interactions, ionic interactions etc, between the analyte and the CSP, to form in-situ transient-diastereomeric complexes.

Most of the types of stationary phases can be classified as Pirkle type (Brush type), Protein-based, Cyclodextrins based, Polymer-based carbohydrates (polysaccharide-based CSPs), Macrocyclic antibiotic, Chiral crown ethers, imprinted polymers, etc.

=== Brush type columns (Pirkle Type) ===
The brush type, or Pirkle type chiral stationary phases are also called π-π Donor-Acceptor columns. According to some theoretical models separation on these CSPs are based on a three-point attachment between the solute and the bonded chiral ligand on the surface of the stationary phase. These interactions may be attractive or repulsive in nature, depending on the mutual properties. Pirkle columns discriminate enantiomers by binding of one enantiomer with the chiral stationary phase, thereby forming a diastereomeric complex through π-π bonding, hydrogen bonding, steric interactions, and/or dipole stacking. Pirkle CSP can be categorized into three classes:

(i) π-electron acceptor

(ii) π-electron donor

(iii) π-electron donor-π-electron acceptor.

=== Protein-based chiral stationary phases ===
A protein-based chiral stationary phase is based on silica-gel, on which a protein is immobilized or bonded. The protein is based on many chiral centers, therefore the mechanism of chiral interaction between the protein and the analytes involves many interactions, such as hydrophobic and electrostatic interactions, hydrogen bonding and charge-transfer interactions, which may contribute to chiral recognition. Hydrophobic interactions between the protein and the analyte are affected by percent organic in the mobile phase. As the organic content increases, retention on protein-based columns decreases.

=== Polysaccharide chiral stationary phases ===
The naturally occurring polysaccharide form the basis for an important group of columns designed for chiral separation. The main polysaccharides are cellulose, amylose, chitosan, dextran, xylan, curdlan, and inulin. Polysaccharide-based stationary phase have a high loading capacity, many chiral centers and complicated stereochemistry, and can be used for the separation of a wide range of compounds.

Polysaccharide-based chiral stationary phases have a wide application due to their high separation efficiency, selectivity, sensitivity and reproducibility under normal and reversed-phase conditions, as well as their broad applicability for structurally diversified compounds. The mechanism of chiral interaction on the polysaccharide-based chiral stationary phase has not yet been elucidated. However, the following interactions are believed to play a role in the retention:

(i) Hydrogen bonding interactions of the polar chiral analyte with carbamate groups on the CSP;

(ii) π-π interactions between phenyl groups on the CSP and aromatic groups of the solute;

(i) Dipole-dipole interactions

(ii) Steric interactions due to the helical structure of the CSP.

These effects on the retention process originate also from the functionality of the derivatives of the polysaccharide, its average molecular weight, and size distribution, the solvent used to immobilize it on the macroporous silica support, and the nature of the macroporous silica support itself.

=== Cyclodextrin (CD) chiral stationary phases ===
Cyclodextrin (CD) chiral stationary phase is produced by partial degradation of starch by the enzyme cyclodextrin glycosyltransferase, followed by enzymatic coupling of the glucose units, forming a toroidal structure. CDs are cyclic oligosaccharides consisting of six (α CDs), seven (β CDs) and eight (γ CDs) glucopyranose units. The chiral recognition mechanism is based on a sort of inclusion complexation. Complexation involves the interaction of the hydrophobic portion of an analyte enantiomer with the non-polar interior of the cavity, while the polar functional groups can form a hydrogen bond with the polar hydroxyl chiral cavity space. The most important factor that determines whether the analyte molecule will fit into the cyclodextrin cavity is its size. The α-CD consists of 30 stereo-selective centers, β-CD consists of 35 stereo-selective centers and γ-CD consists of 40 stereo-selective centers. When the hydrophobic portion of the analyte is larger or smaller than the toroid's cavity size, inclusion will not occur.

=== Macrocyclic chiral stationary phases ===
Macrocyclic chiral stationary phases consist of a silica support, on which macrocyclic antibiotic molecules are bonded. The commonly used macrocyclic antibiotics include rifamycin, glycopeptides (for example, avoparcin, teicoplanin, ristocetin A, vancomycin, and their analogs), polypeptide antibiotic thiostrepton, and aminoglycosides (for example, fradiomycin, kanamycin, and streptomycin). The macrocyclic antibiotics interact with the analyte through hydrogen bonds, dipole-dipole interactions with the polar groups of the analyte, ionic interactions and π-π interactions.

=== Chiral crown ether ===
Chiral crown stationary phases consist Crown ethers, immobilized or bonded to the support particles, are polyethers with a macrocyclic structure that can create host-guest complexes with alkali, earth-alkali metal ions, and ammonium cations. The skeleton of the cyclic structure is composed of oxygen and methylene groups arranged alternately. The electron-donating ether oxygens are positioned within the inner wall of the crown cavity, and are encircled by methylene groups in a collar-like arrangement. The chiral recognition is based on two distinct diastereomeric inclusion complexes that can be generated. The primary interactions facilitating complexation involve hydrogen bonds, formed between the three amine hydrogens and the oxygens of the macrocyclic ether, arranged in a tripod configuration. Additionally, ionic interactions, dipole-dipole interactions, or hydrogen bonds can occur between the carbocyclic groups and polar groups of the analytes, providing further support for the complexes.

=== Method Development ===
Method development of chiral chromatography is still done by screening of columns from the various classes of chiral columns. While chiral separation mechanisms are understandable in certain scenarios, and the retention characteristics of analytes within the chromatographic columns can occasionally be elucidated, the precise combination of chiral stationary phases (CSPs) and mobile-phase compositions that required to effectively resolve a specific enantiomeric pair often remains elusive.

The chemistry of CSP ligands significantly influences the creation of in-situ diastereomeric complexes upon the stationary phase surface. However, other method's conditions, such as mobile-phase solvents, their composition, mobile phase additives and column temperature can play equally critical roles. The final resolution of the enantiomers is the outcome of combination of intermolecular forces, and even a subtle change in them can determine the success or failure of separation. This complexity prevents from establishing routine method-development protocols that are universally applicable to a diverse range of enantiomers. In fact, sometimes the outcome of previous unsuccessful experiments do not provide any clue for the subsequent steps. Therefore, in practice, a chiral method development laboratory settings, acts like a high-throughput screening protocol, of conducting a systematic screening of various CSP's by advanced column switching devices, trying automatically and systematically various mobile-phase combinations, effectively employing a trial-and-error strategy.

Because of the highly complex retention mechanism of a chiral stationary-phase due to chiral recognition, whose principles have not been deciphered, it is often difficult, if not impossible to predict in advance the steps that can be successfully applied to the enantiomers at hand as part of method development. That's why the standard approach in the method development is high throughput screening, to evaluate or examine a series of stationary phases, using various mobile-phase combinations, to increase the chance of finding a suitable separation condition.

== See also ==
- Chiral thin-layer chromatography
