= Α-Cyclodextrin =

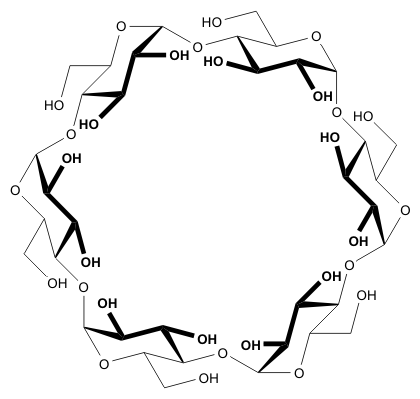

Names
- IUPAC name cyclomaltohexaose
- Systematic IUPAC name cyclohexakis-(1→4)-α-D-glucopyranosyl
- Other names Cyclohexaamylose; Cyclohexadextrin; Cyclomaltohexose α-Cycloamylose α-Dextrin

Identifiers
CAS Number	10016-20-3 (hydrate)
3D model (JSmol)	Interactive image
ChEBI	CHEBI:40585
ChEMBL	ChEMBL1230813
ChemSpider	392705
DrugBank	DB01909
ECHA InfoCard	100.029.995
EC Number	233-007-4
KEGG	D08846
PubChem CID	444913
UNII	Z1LH97KTRM (hydrate)
CompTox Dashboard (EPA)	DTXSID7030698
- InChI: InChI=1S/C36H60O30/c37-1-7-25-13(43)19(49)31(55-7)62-26-8(2-38)57-33(21(51)15(26)45)64-28-10(4-40)59-35(23(53)17(28)47)66-30-12(6-42)60-36(24(54)18(30)48)65-29-11(5-41)58-34(22(52)16(29)46)63-27-9(3-39)56-32(61-25)20(50)14(27)44/h7-54H,1-6H2/t7-,8-,9-,10-,11-,12-,13-,14-,15-,16-,17-,18-,19-,20-,21-,22-,23-,24-,25-,26-,27-,28-,29-,30-,31-,32-,33-,34-,35-,36-/m1/s1 Key: HFHDHCJBZVLPGP-RWMJIURBSA-N
- SMILES: C([C@@H]1[C@@H]2[C@@H]([C@H]([C@H](O1)O[C@@H]3[C@H](O[C@@H]([C@@H]([C@H]3O)O)O[C@@H]4[C@H](O[C@@H]([C@@H]([C@H]4O)O)O[C@@H]5[C@H](O[C@@H]([C@@H]([C@H]5O)O)O[C@@H]6[C@H](O[C@@H]([C@@H]([C@H]6O)O)O[C@@H]7[C@H](O[C@H](O2)[C@@H]([C@H]7O)O)CO)CO)CO)CO)CO)O)O)O

Properties
Chemical formula	C_{36}H_{60}O_{30}
Molar mass	972.846 g·mol^{−1}
Appearance	white solid
Melting point	507 °C (945 °F; 780 K) at fast heating rates, decomposition below 300 °C for conventional heating
Solubility in water	14.5 g/100 mL
- Except where otherwise noted, data are given for materials in their standard state (at 25 °C [77 °F], 100 kPa). Infobox references

α-Cyclodextrin (alpha-cyclodextrin), sometimes abbreviated as α-CD, is a hexasaccharide derived from glucose. It is related to the β- (beta) and γ- (gamma) cyclodextrins, which contain seven and eight glucose units, respectively. All cyclodextrins are white, water-soluble solids with minimal toxicity. Cyclodextrins tend to bind other molecules in their quasi-cylindrical, lipophilic interiors. The compound is of wide interest because it exhibits host–guest properties, forming inclusion compounds. This inclusion (and release) behavior leads to applications in medicine.

== Structure ==
In α-cyclodextrin, the six glucose subunits are linked end to end via α-1, 4 linkages. The result has the shape of a tapered cylinder, with six primary alcohols on one face and twelve secondary alcohol groups on the other. The exterior surface of cyclodextrins is somewhat hydrophilic whereas the interior core is hydrophobic.

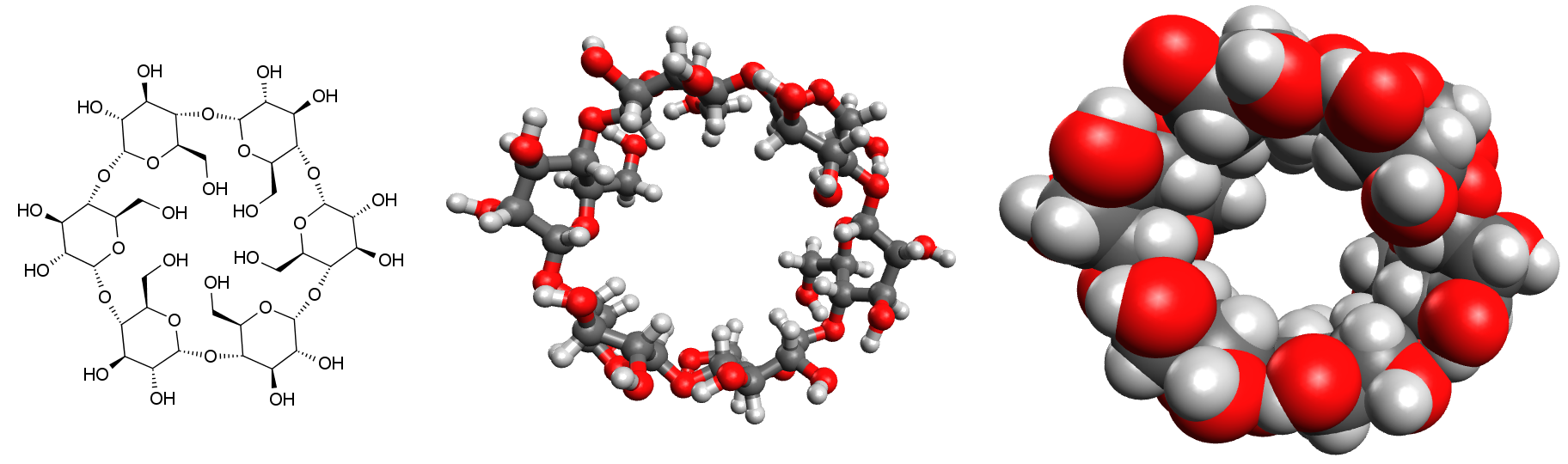
Three representations of α-cyclodextrin.

== Applications ==
α-Cyclodextrin is marketed for a range of medical, healthcare, and food and beverage applications. For drug delivery, this cyclodextrin confers aqueous solubility to hydrophobic drugs and stability to labile drugs.

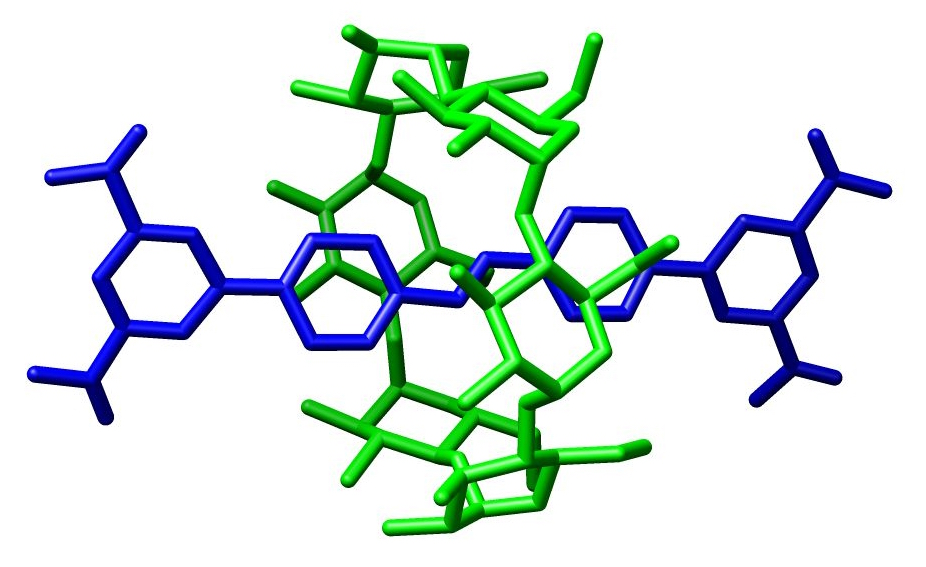
Crystal structure of a rotaxane with an α-cyclodextrin macrocycle.

== Synthesis ==
Cyclodextrins are natural starch-conversion products. For industrial use, they are manufactured by enzymatic degradation from vegetable raw materials, such as corn or potatoes. First, the starch is liquified either by heat treatment or using α-amylase. Then cyclodextrin glycosyltransferase (CGTase) is added for enzymatic conversion. CGTases produce diverse cyclodextrins. The selectivity of the synthesis can be improved by the addition of specific guests.

== See also ==
- β-Cyclodextrin
- γ-Cyclodextrin
