= Γ-Cyclodextrin =

γ-cyclodextrin
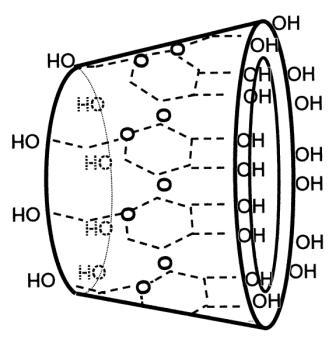

Names
- IUPAC name cyclomaltooctaaose
- Systematic IUPAC name cyclooctaakis-(1→4)-α-D-glucopyranosyl
- Other names Cyclooctaamylose; Cyclooctadextrin gammadex ringdex C

Identifiers
CAS Number	17465-86-0 (hydrate)
3D model (JSmol)	Interactive image
Beilstein Reference	78740
ChEBI	CHEBI:495056
ChEMBL	ChEMBL3182126
ChemSpider	10469499
ECHA InfoCard	100.037.696
E number	E458 (thickeners, ...)
PubChem CID	5287407
UNII	KZJ0BYZ5VA (hydrate)
CompTox Dashboard (EPA)	DTXSID5047033
- InChI: InChI=1S/C48H80O40/c49-1-9-33-17(57)25(65)41(73-9)82-34-10(2-50)75-43(27(67)19(34)59)84-36-12(4-52)77-45(29(69)21(36)61)86-38-14(6-54)79-47(31(71)23(38)63)88-40-16(8-56)80-48(32(72)24(40)64)87-39-15(7-55)78-46(30(70)22(39)62)85-37-13(5-53)76-44(28(68)20(37)60)83-35-11(3-51)74-42(81-33)26(66)18(35)58/h9-72H,1-8H2/t9-,10-,11-,12-,13-,14-,15-,16-,17-,18-,19-,20-,21-,22-,23-,24-,25-,26-,27-,28-,29-,30-,31-,32-,33-,34-,35-,36-,37-,38-,39-,40-,41-,42-,43-,44-,45-,46-,47-,48-/m1/s1 Key: GDSRMADSINPKSL-HSEONFRVSA-N
- SMILES: C(C1C2C(C(C(O1)OC3C(OC(C(C3O)O)OC4C(OC(C(C4O)O)OC5C(OC(C(C5O)O)OC6C(OC(C(C6O)O)OC7C(OC(C(C7O)O)OC8C(OC(C(C8O)O)OC9C(OC(O2)C(C9O)O)CO)CO)CO)CO)CO)CO)CO)O)O)O

Properties
Chemical formula	C_{48}H_{80}O_{40}
Molar mass	1297.128 g·mol^{−1}
Appearance	white solid
Density	1.41 g/cm^{3}
Melting point	474 °C (885 °F; 747 K) at fast heating rates, decomposition below 300 °C for conventional heating
Solubility in water	23.2 g/100 mL
- Except where otherwise noted, data are given for materials in their standard state (at 25 °C [77 °F], 100 kPa). Infobox references

γ-Cyclodextrin sometimes abbreviated as γ-CD, is an octasaccharide derived from glucose. The α- (alpha), β- (beta), and γ- (gamma) cyclodextrins correspond to six, seven, and eight glucose units, respectively.

== Structure ==
In γ-cyclodextrin, the eight glucose subunits are linked end to end via α-1,4 linkages. The result has the shape of a tapered cylinder, with 8 primary alcohols on one face and 16 secondary alcohol groups on the other. The exterior surface of cyclodextrins is somewhat hydrophilic whereas the interior core is hydrophobic.

== Physical properties ==
γ-Cyclodextrin exists as a white (colorless) powder or crystals. The density of its hydrate crystal (γCD·14H_{2}O) is 1.41 g/cm^{3}. γ-Cyclodextrin is well soluble in water and dimethyl sulfoxide, poorly soluble in methanol.

== Applications ==
γ-Cyclodextrin has the largest cavity size of the natural cyclodextrins, thus making it well-suited to accommodate larger biomolecules and other substances. For this reason, γ-Cyclodextrin is most commonly used as a complexing agent. γ-Cyclodextrin is widely used in medicine, pharmacy, food industry, cosmetics, and textiles.

== Derivatives ==
To increase solubility, hydroxypropylated γ-cyclodextrin derivative (HPγCD) is obtained by treating the natural cyclodextrin with propylene oxide, and sulfobutylether γ-cyclodextrin (SBEγCD) by treating the natural CD with 1,4-butane sultone. Sugammadex is the derivative of γ-cyclodextrin applied as a medication.

== See also ==
- α-Cyclodextrin
- β-Cyclodextrin
