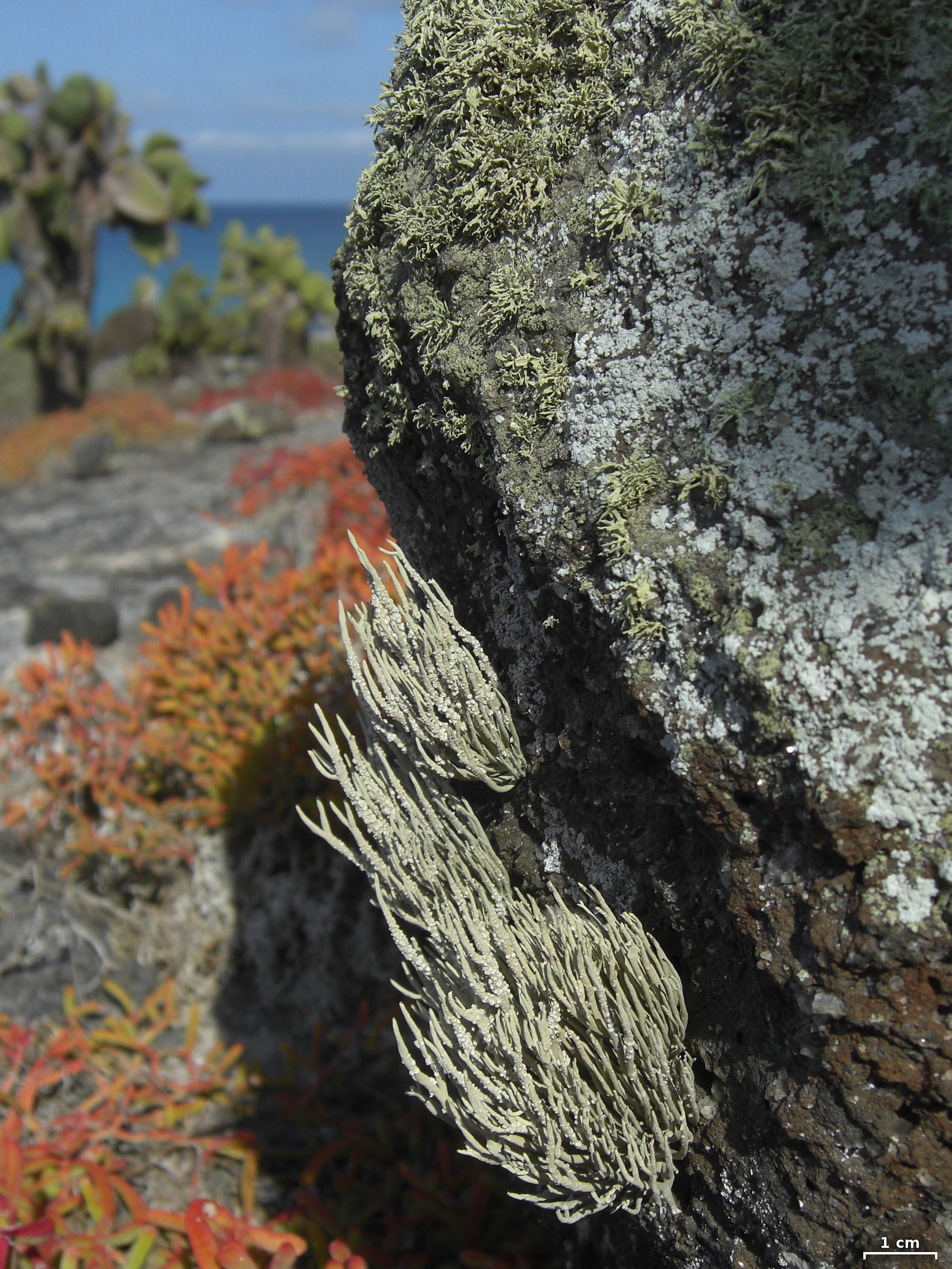

Scientific classification
- Domain: Eukaryota
- Kingdom: Fungi
- Division: Ascomycota
- Class: Arthoniomycetes
- Order: Arthoniales
- Family: Roccellaceae
- Genus: Roccella
- Species: R. albida

Binomial name
- Roccella albida Tehler (2009)

= Roccella albida =

Species of lichen

Roccella albida is a species of saxicolous (rock-dwelling), fruticose lichen in the family Roccellaceae. It is found on the Galápagos Islands. The lichen is characterised by its distinctively shaped, cylindrical or slightly depressed branches that vary in length from 5 to 20 cm and are white to white-greyish in colour, with infrequent soredia. The lichen has a cottony medulla, commonly white or sometimes pale yellowish-brown, and has frequent ascomata (fruiting bodies) with wavy margins.

== Taxonomy ==
The lichen was formally described as a new species in 2009 by the mycologist Anders Tehler. The species epithet albida is derived from its whitish thallus, distinguishing it from the more brownish-grey thalli of its closely related species such as Roccella galapagoensis, R. margaritifera, and R. nigerrima.

== Description ==
Roccella albida has a distinctively shaped thallus, which forms branches that are terete (cylindrical and smooth) or slightly foveate (marked with small depressions). These branches generally range in length from 5 to 20 cm and have a colouration that varies from white to white-greyish. Soredia, which are reproductive structures for asexual reproduction, are infrequently found in this species and show a negative reaction to the C spot test.

The medulla, the inner tissue of the thallus, is byssoid or nearly byssoid, meaning it has a fibrous or cottony texture. Its colouration is predominantly white, though it can sometimes appear pale yellowish-brown, especially in the lower parts of the lichen. Ascomata, the spore-producing structures, are a common feature in Roccella albida. They often appear sessile (directly attached without a stalk) and have strongly undulating margins, which give them a knotty appearance. The ascospores of Roccella albida measure between 22 and 26 μm in length and 5 to 6 μm in width, with an average size of approximately 23.8 by 5.5 μm.

Chemical spot tests yield negative results for the medulla with both potassium hydroxide (K) and calcium hypochlorite (C), indicated as K− and C−, respectively. However, the cortex is C+ (red), and K−. The disc of the ascomata is C−. In terms of its chemical makeup, Roccella albida contains secondary metabolites (lichen products) such as erythrin, lecanoric acid, and protocetraric acid, as identified by high-performance thin-layer chromatography.

== Habitat and distribution ==
Roccella albida is native exclusively to the Galápagos Islands, with its presence confirmed on the islands Santa Fe, Floreana, Pinzón, Rábida, San Cristóbal, Santa Cruz, and Española. This species thrives in coastal areas, predominantly on vertical rocks and cliffs.
