= Cholesterol consensus domain =

Cholesterol-binding protein domain

Cholesterol Consensus Domains are highly conserved protein motifs that bind cholesterol. They are commonly located in alpha helices of transmembrane domains within integral membrane proteins, although examples in β-strands have also been found.

== Description ==
CRAC (cholesterol-recognition amino acid consensus) is defined by the amino acid sequence (L/V)-X1–5-(Y)-X1–5-(K/R) where X1-5 represents any 5 amino acids. The CRAC motif on a transmembrane protein is preferentially located in the inner leaflet. CARC is the reverse sequence of the CRAC motif, characterized by (K/R)-X1–5-(Y/F)-X1–5-(L/V), and is mostly found on the outer leaflet portion of a transmembrane protein. Tyrosine is a mandatory central residue in CRAC, while CARC can bind using either a central tyrosine or phenylalanine to support pi bond stacking. The basic lysine and arginine residues at the C-terminus of CRAC and at the N-terminus of CARC ensure positioning of cholesterol's apex hydrophilic hydroxyl group at the periphery of the membrane such that the hydrophobic majority of cholesterol is submerged in the membrane.

Cholesterol consensus domains have been studied in several protein classes including receptors (benzodiazepine receptors, nicotinic acetylcholine receptors, GPCRs) and transporters (ATP-binding cassette (ABC) transporters ABCG1, P-glycoprotein (P-gp), and solute carrier transporters like human organic cation transporter 2).

Cholesterol binding is associated with increased activity of ion-channel proteins. Cholesterol binding may be competitively inhibitory to ATPase activity and substrate export of transporter P-gp in multi-drug-resistant (MDR) cells, resulting in a slowed export rate of anti-cancer molecules from the cell. However, P-gp basal ATPase activity was inhibited after cholesterol depletion by Methyl-beta-cyclodextrin, suggesting that cholesterol binding activates P-gp ATPase activity.

Not all proteins with cholesterol consensus domains are involved in cholesterol binding, however, as the motif has been found in the proteome of bacteria that lack cholesterol.

== Related motifs ==
The cholesterol consensus domain should not be confused with the cholesterol consensus motif (CCM), which has the similar sequence (K/R)-X2-6-(I/V/L)-X3-(W/Y), and is found in class A G-protein coupled receptors such as the β2 adrenergic receptor.
