= Thin-layer chromatography =

Technique used to separate non-volatile mixtures

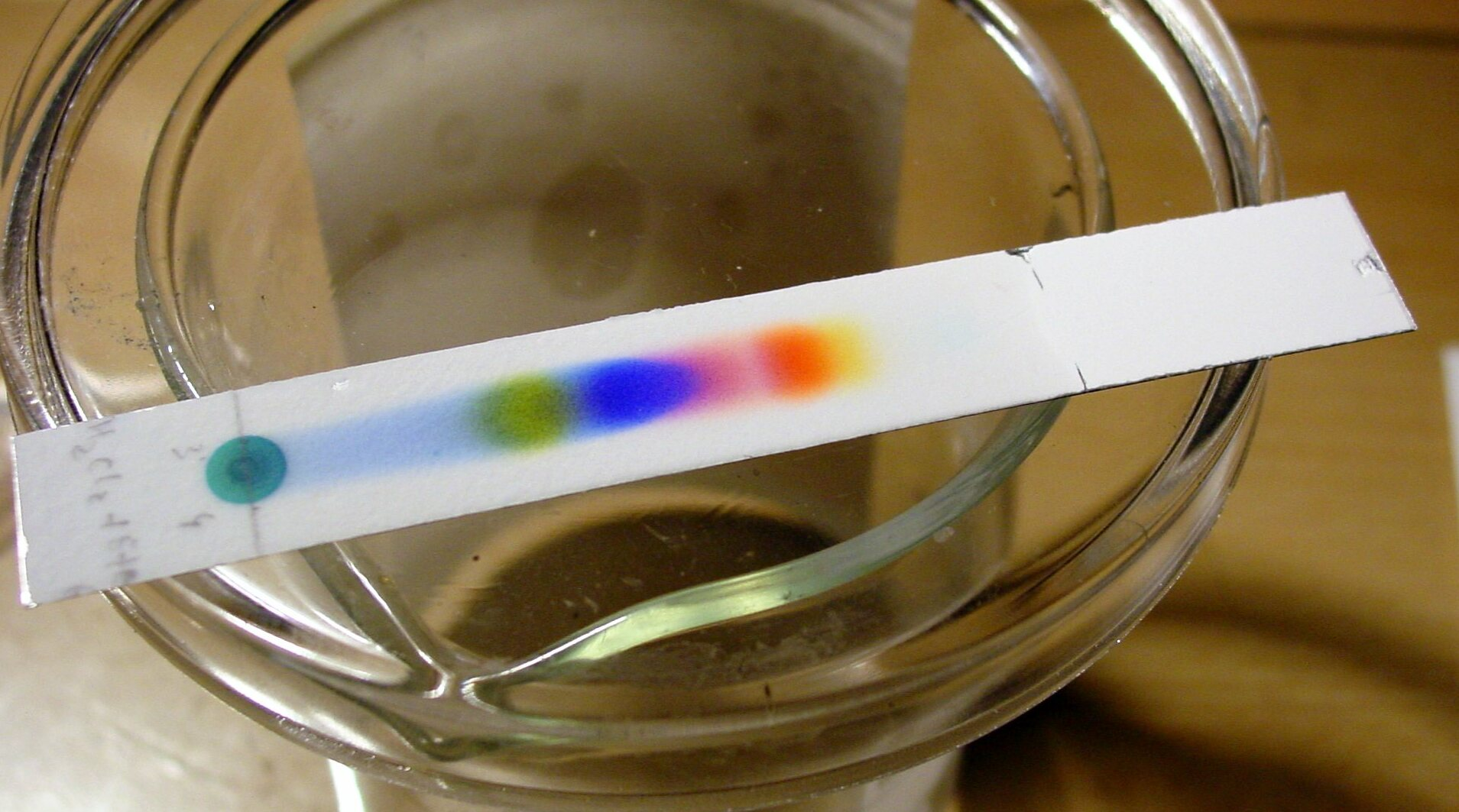
- Separation of black ink on a TLC plate
- Acronym: TLC
- Classification: Chromatography

Other techniques
- Related: HPTLC; Paper chromatography; Agarose gel electrophoresis; SDS-PAGE

Thin-layer chromatography (TLC) is a chromatography technique that separates components in non-volatile mixtures.

It is performed on a TLC plate made up of a non-reactive solid coated with a thin layer of adsorbent material. This is called the stationary phase. The sample is deposited on the plate, which is eluted with a solvent or solvent mixture known as the mobile phase (or eluent). This solvent then moves up the plate via capillary action. As with all chromatography, some compounds are more attracted to the mobile phase, while others are more attracted to the stationary phase. Therefore, different compounds move up the TLC plate at different speeds and become separated. To visualize colourless compounds, the plate is viewed under UV light or is stained. Testing different stationary and mobile phases is often necessary to obtain well-defined and separated spots.

TLC is quick, simple, and gives high sensitivity for a relatively low cost. It can monitor reaction progress, identify compounds in a mixture, determine purity, or purify small amounts of compound.

== Procedure ==
The process for TLC is similar to paper chromatography but provides faster runs, better separations, and the choice between different stationary phases. Plates can be labelled before or after the chromatography process with a pencil or other implement that will not interfere with the process.

There are four main stages to running a thin-layer chromatography plate:

Plate preparation: Using a capillary tube, a small amount of a concentrated solution of the sample is deposited near the bottom edge of a TLC plate. The solvent is allowed to evaporate before the next step completely. A vacuum chamber may be necessary for non-volatile solvents. The spotting procedure can be repeated to ensure sufficient compound to obtain a visible result. Depending on the application, multiple samples may be placed in a row, the same distance from the bottom edge; each sample will move up the plate in its own "lane."

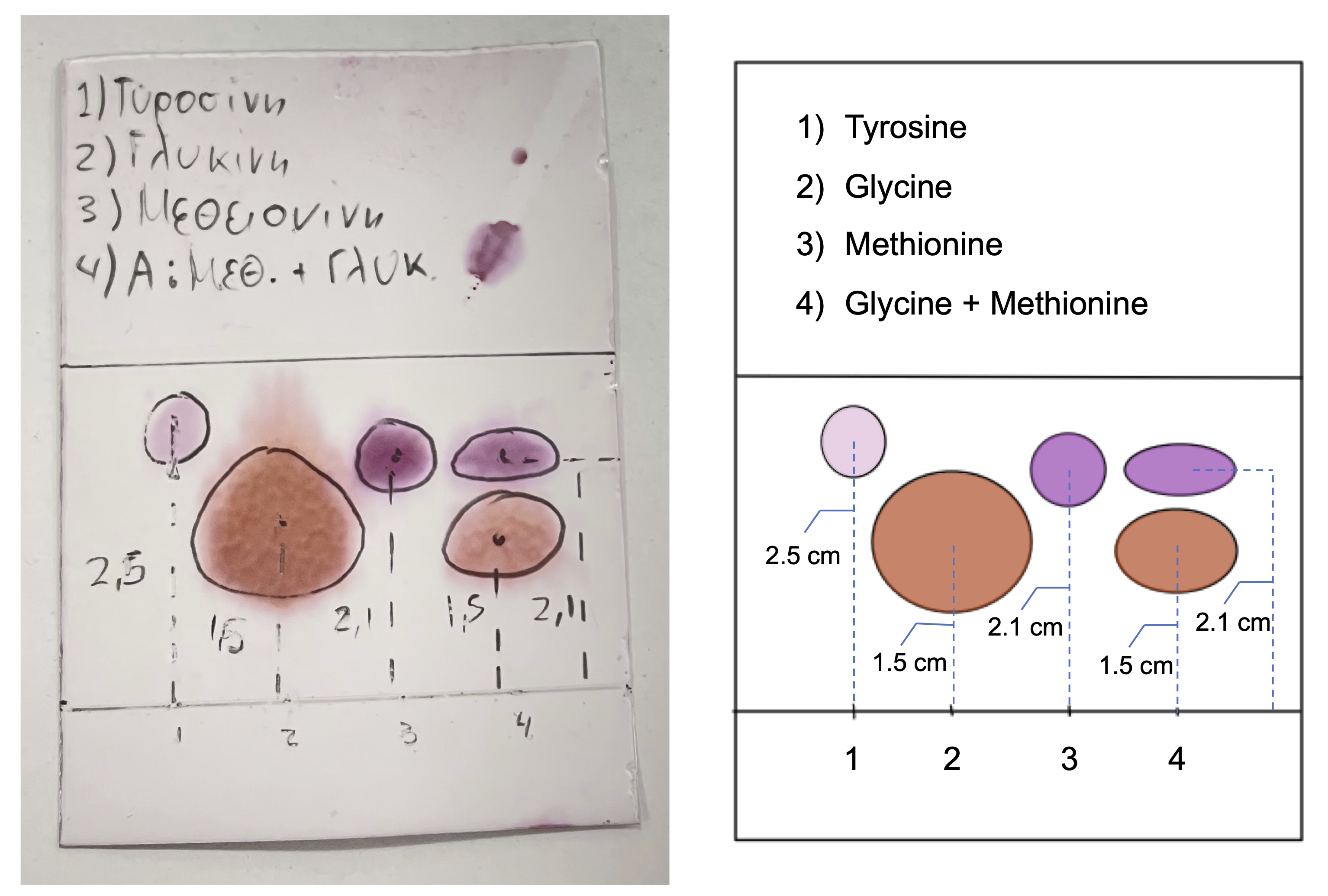
TLC of three amino acids and a sample (left) with an English translation (right)

Development chamber preparation: The development solvent or solvent mixture is placed into a transparent container (separation/development chamber) to a depth of less than 1 centimetre. A strip of filter paper (aka "wick") is also placed along the container wall. This filter paper should touch the solvent and almost reach the top of the container. The container is covered with a lid and the solvent vapors are allowed to saturate the atmosphere of the container. Failure to do so results in poor separation and non-reproducible results.

Development: The TLC plate is placed in the container such that the sample spot(s) are not submerged into the mobile phase. The container is covered to prevent solvent evaporation. The solvent migrates up the plate by capillary action, meets the sample mixture, and carries it up the plate (elutes the sample). The plate is removed from the container before the solvent reaches the top of the plate; otherwise, the results will be misleading. The solvent front, the highest mark the solvent has travelled along the plate, is marked.

Visualization: The solvent evaporates from the plate. Visualization methods include UV light, staining, and many more.

== Separation process and principle ==
The separation of compounds is due to the differences in their attraction to the stationary phase and because of differences in solubility in the solvent. Different compounds in the sample mixture travel at different rates due to the differences in their partition coefficients. Different solvents, or different solvent mixtures, give different separations. The retardation factor (R_{F}) quantifies the results. It is the distance traveled by a given substance divided by the distance traveled by the mobile phase.

Development of a TLC plate. Spots that appear purple separate into red spots and blue spots.

In normal-phase TLC, the stationary phase is polar. Silica gel is very common in normal-phase TLC. More polar compounds in a sample mixture interact more strongly with the polar stationary phase. As a result, more-polar compounds move less (resulting in smaller R_{F}) while less-polar compounds move higher up the plate (higher R_{F}). A more-polar mobile phase dissolves polar compounds more. As such, all compounds on the TLC plate move higher up the plate in polar solvent mixtures. "Strong" solvents move compounds higher up the plate, whereas "weak" solvents move them less.

If the stationary phase is non-polar, like C18-functionalized silica plates, it is called reverse-phase TLC. In this case, non-polar compounds move less and polar compounds move more. The solvent mixture will also be much more polar than in normal-phase TLC.

=== Solvent choice ===
An eluotropic series, which orders solvents by how much they move compounds, can help select a mobile phase. Solvents are divided into solvent selectivity groups. Using solvents with different elution strengths or different selectivity groups can often give very different results. While single-solvent mobile phases can sometimes give good separation, some cases may require solvent mixtures.

In normal-phase TLC, the most common solvent mixtures include ethyl acetate/hexanes (EtOAc/Hex) for less-polar compounds and methanol/dichloromethane (MeOH/DCM) for more polar compounds. Different solvent mixtures and solvent ratios can help give better separation. In reverse-phase TLC, solvent mixtures are typically water with a less-polar solvent: Typical choices are water with tetrahydrofuran (THF), acetonitrile (ACN), or methanol.

== Analysis ==
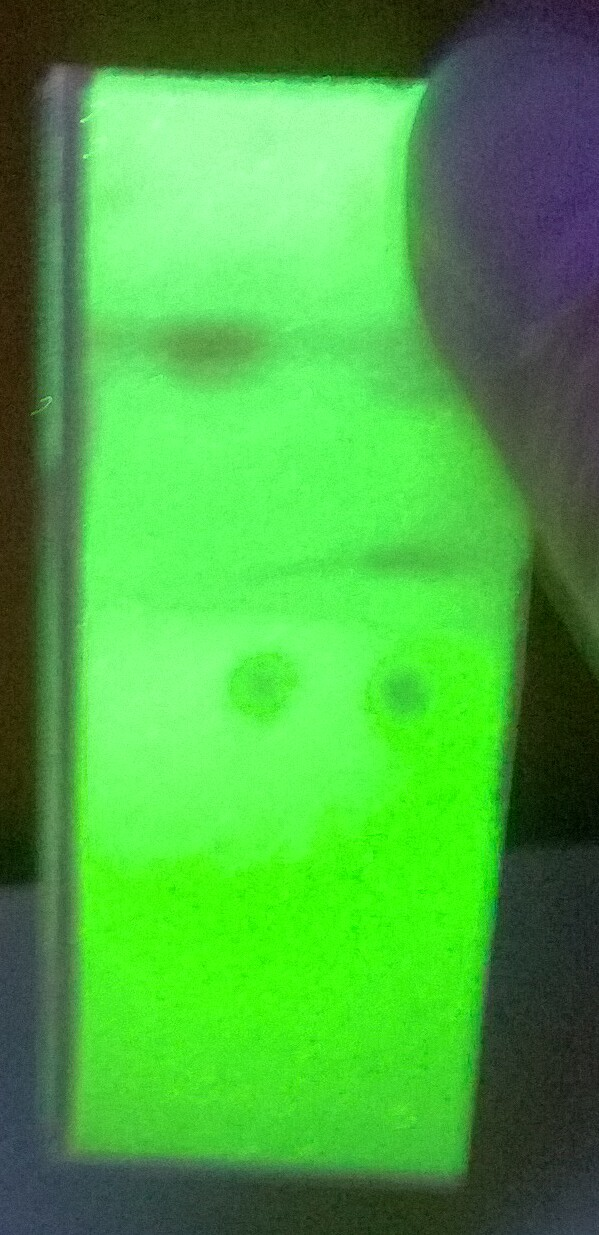
TLC plate visualised with UV-light

As the chemicals being separated may be colourless, several methods exist to visualise the spots:

- Placing the plate under blacklight (366 nm light) makes fluorescent compounds glow
- TLC plates containing a small amount of fluorescent compound (usually manganese-activated zinc silicate) in the adsorbent layer allow for visualisation of some compounds under UV-C light (254 nm). The adsorbent layer will fluoresce light-green, while spots containing compounds that absorb UV-C light will not.
- Placing the plate in a container filled with iodine vapours temporarily stains the spots. They typically become a yellow or brown colour.
- The TLC plate can either be dipped in or sprayed with a stain and sometimes heated depending on the stain used. Many stains exist for a large range of chemical moieties but some examples include:
  - Potassium permanganate (no heating, for oxidisable groups)
  - Ninhydrin (heating, amines and amino-acids)
  - Acidic vanillin (heating, general reagent)
  - Phosphomolybdic acid (no heating, general reagent)
- In the case of lipids, the chromatogram may be transferred to a polyvinylidene fluoride membrane and then subjected to further analysis, for example, mass spectrometry. This technique is known as far-eastern blot.

== Plate production ==
TLC plates are usually commercially available, with standard particle size ranges to improve reproducibility. They are prepared by mixing the adsorbent, such as silica gel, with a small amount of inert binder like calcium sulfate (gypsum) and water. This mixture is spread as a thick slurry on an unreactive carrier sheet, usually glass, thick aluminum foil, or plastic. The resultant plate is dried and activated by heating in an oven for thirty minutes at 110 °C. The thickness of the absorbent layer is typically around 0.1–0.25 mm for analytical purposes and around 0.5–2.0 mm for preparative TLC. Other adsorbent coatings include aluminium oxide (alumina), or cellulose.

== Applications ==
=== Reaction monitoring and characterization ===
TLC is a valuable tool for reaction monitoring. For this, the plate normally contains a spot of starting material, a spot from the reaction mixture, and a co-spot (or cross-spot) containing both. The analysis will show if the starting material disappeared and if any new products appeared. This provides a quick and easy way to estimate how far a reaction has proceeded. In one study, TLC has been applied to screen organic reactions. The researchers react an alcohol and a catalyst directly in the co-spot of a TLC plate before developing it. This provides quick and easy small-scale testing of different reagents.

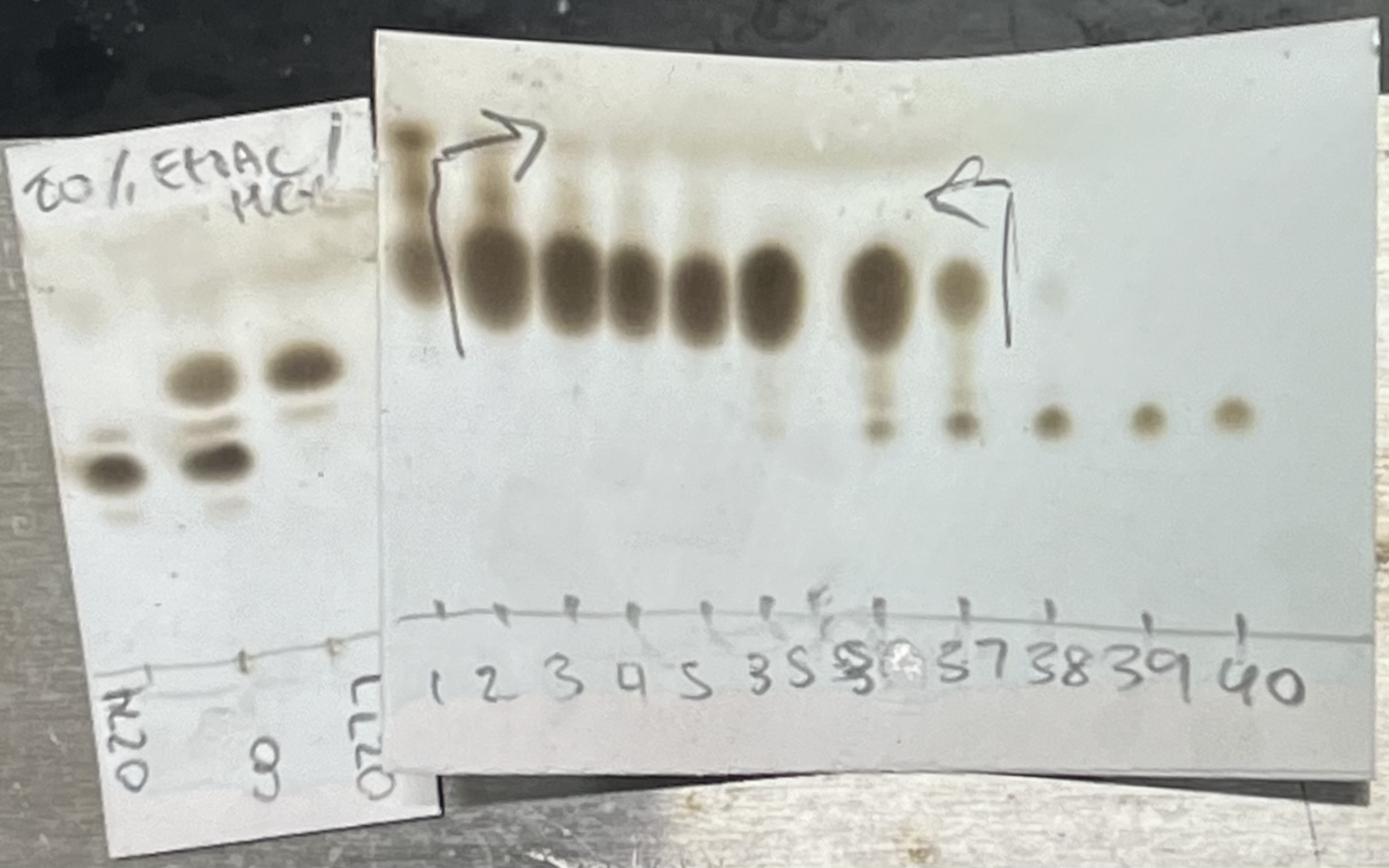
TLC for reaction monitoring and choosing a purification solvent mixture (left)TLC from the resulting flash column chromatography (right)

Compound characterization with TLC is also possible and is similar to reaction monitoring. However, rather than spotting with starting material and reaction mixture, it is with an unknown and a known compound. They may be the same compound if both spots have the same R_{F} and look the same under the chosen visualization method. However, co-elution complicates both reaction monitoring and characterization. This is because different compounds will move to the same spot on the plate. In such cases, different solvent mixtures may provide better separation.

=== Purity and purification ===
TLC helps show the purity of a sample. A pure sample should only contain one spot by TLC. TLC is also useful for small-scale purification. Because the separated compounds will be on different areas of the plate, a scientist can scrape off the stationary phase particles containing the desired compound and dissolve them into an appropriate solvent. Once all the compound dissolves in the solvent, they filter out the silica particles, then evaporate the solvent to isolate the product. Big preparative TLC plates with thick silica gel coatings can separate more than 100 mg of material.

TLC is useful for larger-scale purification and isolation to quickly test solvent mixtures before running flash column chromatography on a large batch of impure material. A compound elutes from a column when the amount of solvent collected is equal to 1/R_{F}. The eluent from flash column chromatography gets collected across several containers (for example, test tubes) called fractions. TLC helps show which fractions contain impurities and which contain pure compound.

Furthermore, two-dimensional TLC can help check if a compound is stable on a particular stationary phase. This test requires two runs on a square-shaped TLC plate. The plate is rotated by 90º before the second run. If the target compound appears on the diagonal of the square, it is stable on the chosen stationary phase. Otherwise, it is decomposing on the plate. If this is the case, an alternative stationary phase may prevent this decomposition.

TLC is also an analytical method for the direct separation of enantiomers and the control of enantiomeric purity, e.g. active pharmaceutical ingredients (APIs) that are chiral.

Separation of green plant matter in spinach (note that images from steps 1–6 are zoomed into the bottom of the plate)

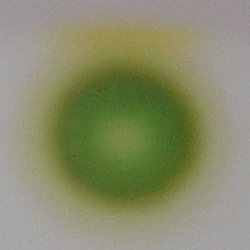
Step 1

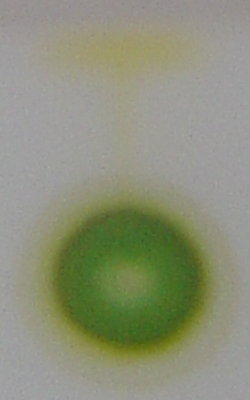
Step 2

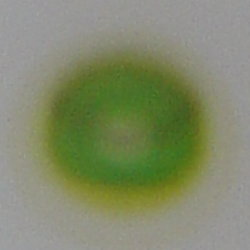
Step 3

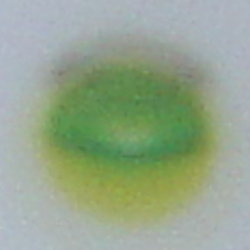
Step 4

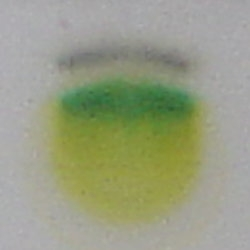
Step 5

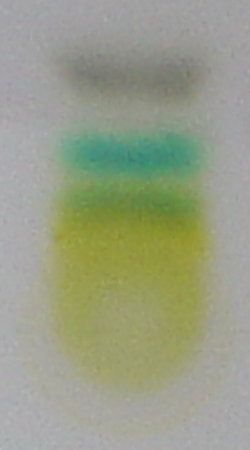
Step 6

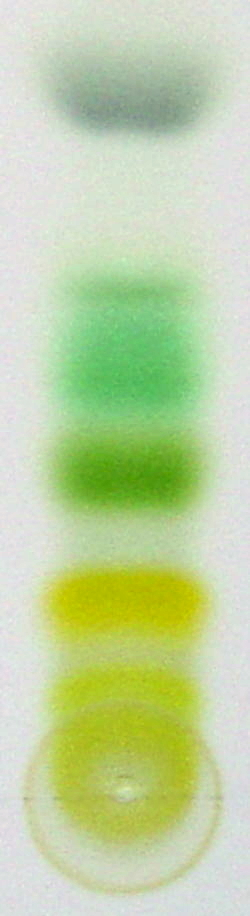
Step 7

== See also ==
- Column chromatography
- HPTLC
- Radial chromatography
- Chiral thin-layer chromatography

== Bibliography ==
- F. Geiss (1987): Fundamentals of thin layer chromatography planar chromatography, Heidelberg, Hüthig, ISBN 3-7785-0854-7
- Justus G. Kirchner (1978): Thin-layer chromatography, 2nd edition, Wiley
- Joseph Sherma, Bernard Fried (1991): Handbook of Thin-Layer Chromatography (= Chromatographic Science. Bd. 55). Marcel Dekker, New York NY, ISBN 0-8247-8335-2.
- Elke Hahn-Deinstorp: Applied Thin-Layer Chromatography. Best Practice and Avoidance of Mistakes. Wiley-VCH, Weinheim u. a. 2000, ISBN 3-527-29839-8
