= Sulfonate ester =

A sulfonic ester is an organic compound with the general formula RSO_{2}OR'. They are also called sulfonic esters. Individual members of the category are named analogously to how ordinary carboxyl esters are named. Many sulfonate esters are known.

== Preparation ==
Propane-1,3-sultone

A common industrial route to sulfonate esters involves the addition of sulfur trioxide to alkenes. This reaction generally affords cyclic sulfonic esters are called sultones. Two examples are propane-1,3-sultone and 1,4-butane sultone. Some sultones are short-lived intermediates, used as strong alkylating agents to introduce a negatively charged sulfonate group. In the presence of water, they slowly hydrolyze to the hydroxy sulfonic acids. Sultone oximes are key intermediates in the synthesis of the anti-convulsant drug zonisamide. Cyclic sulfonate esters arise as intermediates in the production of surfactants obtained by the addition of sulfur trioxide to terminal alkenes. Hydrolysis of these sultones gives hydroxysulfonates.

Sulfonate ester intermediate in the production of surfactants.

In the laboratory, a common method is by the condensation of a sulfonyl halide with an alcohol:

RSO_{2}Cl + R'OH → RSO_{3}R' + HCl

Equivalently the anhydrides of sulfonic acids can be used in place of the sulfonyl chloride.

Sulfonate esters can also be prepared by alkylation of sulfonate anions or sulfonic acids. Diazomethane converts sulfonic acids to their methyl esters:

RSO_{3}H + CH_{2}N_{2} → RSO_{3}CH_{3} + N_{2}

== Uses ==
Sulfonic esters are used as reagents in organic synthesis, chiefly because the RSO^{−}_{3} group is a good leaving group, especially when R is electron-withdrawing. Methyl triflate, for example, is a strong methylating reagent.
