= 1,4-Butane sultone =

Names
- Preferred IUPAC name 1,2λ^{6}-Oxathiane-2,2-dione
- Other names δ-Butane sultone, δ-Valerosultone, Oxathiane 2,2-dioxide

Identifiers
CAS Number	1633-83-6
3D model (JSmol)	Interactive image
Beilstein Reference	5-19-01-00010
ChEMBL	ChEMBL26967
ChemSpider	14670
ECHA InfoCard	100.015.135
EC Number	216-647-9
PubChem CID	15411
UNII	4E0C1CLI2C
CompTox Dashboard (EPA)	DTXSID4061836
- InChI: InChI=1S/C4H8O3S/c5-8(6)4-2-1-3-7-8/h1-4H2 Key: MHYFEEDKONKGEB-UHFFFAOYSA-N
- SMILES: C1CCS(=O)(=O)OC1

Properties
Chemical formula	C_{4}H_{8}O_{3}S
Molar mass	136.17 g·mol^{−1}

Hazards
- GHS labelling
Pictograms	(GHS07: Exclamation mark) (GHS08: Health hazard)
Signal word	Warning
Hazard statements	H302, H315, H319, H335, H341, H351, H412
Precautionary statements	P201, P202, P261, P264, P270, P271, P273, P280, P281, P301+P312, P302+P352, P304+P340, P305+P351+P338, P308+P313, P312, P321, P330, P332+P313, P337+P313, P362, P403+P233, P405, P501
- Except where otherwise noted, data are given for materials in their standard state (at 25 °C [77 °F], 100 kPa). Infobox references

1,4-butane sultone is a six-membered δ-sultone and the cyclic ester of 4-hydroxybutanesulfonic acid. As a sulfo-alkylating agent, 1,4-butanesultone is used to introduce the sulfobutyl group (–(CH_{2})_{4}–SO_{3}^{−}) into hydrophobic compounds possessing nucleophilic functional groups, for example hydroxy groups (as in the case of β-cyclodextrin) or amino groups (as in the case of polymethine dyes). In such, the sulfobutyl group is present as neutral sodium salt and considerably increases the water solubility of the derivatives.

== Preparation ==
A lab scale synthesis of 1,4-butanesultone starts from 4,4'-dichlorodibutyl ether (accessible from tetrahydrofuran treated with phosphorus oxychloride and concentrated sulfuric acid), which reacts with sodium sulfite forming the corresponding 4,4'-butanedisulfonic disodium salt. By passing it through an acidic ion exchanger, the disodium salt is converted into the disulphonic acid which forms two molecules of 1,4-butanesultone at elevated temperature and reduced pressure under elimination of water. The yields obtained range from 72 to 80%.

Synthese von 1,4-Butansulton aus Bis-4-chlorbutylether

Starting from 4-chlorobutan-1-ol (from tetrahydrofuran and hydrogen chloride in 54 to 57% yield), the sodium salt of 4-hydroxybutan-1-sulfonic acid is obtained with sodium sulfite. This salt is converted with strong acids (such as hydrochloric acid) into the very hygroscopic 4-hydroxybutanesulfonic acid and cyclized to 1,4-butanesultone under elimination of water.

The cyclization of 4-hydroxybutanesulfonic acid in aqueous solution proceeds particularly efficiently when heated with high-boiling, water-immiscible solvents (for example 1,2-dichlorobenzene or diethylbenzene, both boiling at about 180 °C) in which 1,4-butane-sultone dissolves and is thereby protected from hydrolysis in the aqueous medium. 1,4-butanesultone is obtained in yields of up to 99% upon reflux within one hour.

Synthese von 1,4-Butansulton aus 4-Chlorbutan-1-ol

The vacuum distillation of the sodium salt of 4-hydroxybutanesulfonic acid leads in the presence of concentrated sulfuric acid directly to 1,4-butanesultone. The sodium salt of 4-chlorobutane-1-sulfonic acid, which is obtained from 1,4-dichlorobutane with sodium sulfite, can also be cyclized to 1,4-butanesultone by heating to 180-250 °C.

Synthese von 1,4-Butansulton aus 4-Chlorbutan-1-sulfonsäure

The free-radical initiated sulfochlorination of 1-chlorobutane leads to a mixture of positionally isomeric sulfochlorides and chlorination products and is therefore not suitable for the direct preparation of 1,4-butanesultone.

== Properties ==
1,4-butanesultone is a viscous, clear, colorless and odorless liquid which reacts in boiling water (to 4-hydroxybutanesulfonic acid) and alcohols (to 4-alkoxybutanesulfonic acid) and dissolves in many organic solvents. At temperatures below the melting point, the compound crystallizes giving "large, magnificent plates". [3] Compared to the homologous γ-sultone 1,3-propanesultone, 1,4-butanesultone is significantly less reactive as alkylating agent, but classified as mutagenic and carcinogenic.

== Applications ==
=== Sulfobetaines ===
1,4-butanesultone reacts smoothly with nucleophiles such as ammonia to form the corresponding zwitterionic, usually very water-soluble sulfobutylbetaines.

Synthese von 4-Aminobutan-1-sulfonsäure aus 1,4-Butansulton

Sulfobetaines with longer alkyl chains (C_{n}H_{2n+1} mit n > 10) show interesting properties as surface-active compounds (surfactants, detergents) with antimicrobial properties.

Synthese eines Alkylpiperidinsulfobetains-Surfactants

In the reaction of N-N-butylimidazole with 1,4-Butansultone in Toluene in a 98% yield is formed 1-butylimidazolium-3-(n-butylsulfonate)

Synthese von ionischen Flüssigkeiten vom Chlorbutylsulfonat-Typ

1-Butylimidazolium-3-(n-butylsulfonate) catalyses as a component of multifunctional catalysts the reaction of platform chemicals from biomass (for example levulinic acid or itaconic acid) into the corresponding lactones, diols or cyclic ethers.

Aminoalkylphosphonic acids (such as aminomethane diphosphonic acid, accessible from phosphorus trichloride, formamide and phosphonic acid) form with 1,4-butanesultone N-(sulfobutyl)aminomethane diphosphonic acids:

Synthese von N-(Sulfobutyl)aminomethandiphosphonsäure-Komplexbildnern

N-(sulfobutyl)aminomethane diphosphonic acid is characterized by very high water solubility (< 1000 g·l^{−1}) and a strong capability as complexing agent and water softener.

Sulfobutylation of cyanine dyes leads to readily water-soluble compounds which react with proteins like antibodies and can be used as pH-sensitive fluorescence markers.

Sulfobutylierter Cyaninfarbstoff als Fluoreszenzmarker

=== Ionic liquids ===
The ionic liquid 4-triethylammonium butane-1-sulfonic acid hydrogensulfate (TEBSA HSO_{4}) is formed by the reaction of 1,4-butanesultone with triethylamine in acetonitrile to the zwitterion (85% yield) and subsequent reaction with concentrated sulfuric acid.

Synthesis of TEBSA HSO_{4}

4-triethylammonium butane-1-sulfonic acid hydrogensulfate can replace conventional mineral acids as effective and easily recyclable acid catalyst in solvent-free reactions.

The ring opening of 1,4-butanesultone with organic chloride salts yields ionic liquids of the 4-chlorobutylsulfonate type in quantitative yield.

Synthesis of ionic liquid 1-Butylimidazolium-3-(n-butylsulfonate)

The chlorine atom in the 4-chlorobutylsulfonate anion can be substituted by heating with inorganic (e.g. potassium fluoride) or organic salts (e.g. sodium acetate) by the respective anion.

Exchange reactions involving chlorbutylsulfonate-ILs

=== Sulfobutylated β-cyclodextrin ===
Already in 1949 the reaction of 1,4-butanesultone with the water-insoluble polysaccharide cellulose in sodium hydroxide solution was reported, which leads to a water-soluble product. Derived from this the derivatization of β-cyclodextrin to sulfobutyl ether-beta-cyclodextrin (SBECD) is by now an important application of 1,4-butanesultone. Sulfobutyl ether-beta-cyclodextrin is a water-soluble inclusion compound for the solubilization and stabilization of sparsely water-soluble and chemically instable components. β-Cyclodextrin can be reacted with 1,4-butanesultone in sodium hydroxide solution at 70 °C to the sulfobutyl ether in yields of up to 80% and a degree of substitution of 6.68.

Sulfobutylierung von beta-Cyclodextrin mit 1,4-Butansulton

Thereby, the water solubility of the β-cyclodextrin increases from 18.5 g · l-1 to more than 900 g · l-1 at 25 °C. Sulfobutyl ether-beta-cyclodextrin also finds a wide range of applications as an inert vehicle for drug delivery (the drugs transport and release).

== See also ==
- 1,3-Propane sultone
