= Chiral thin-layer chromatography =

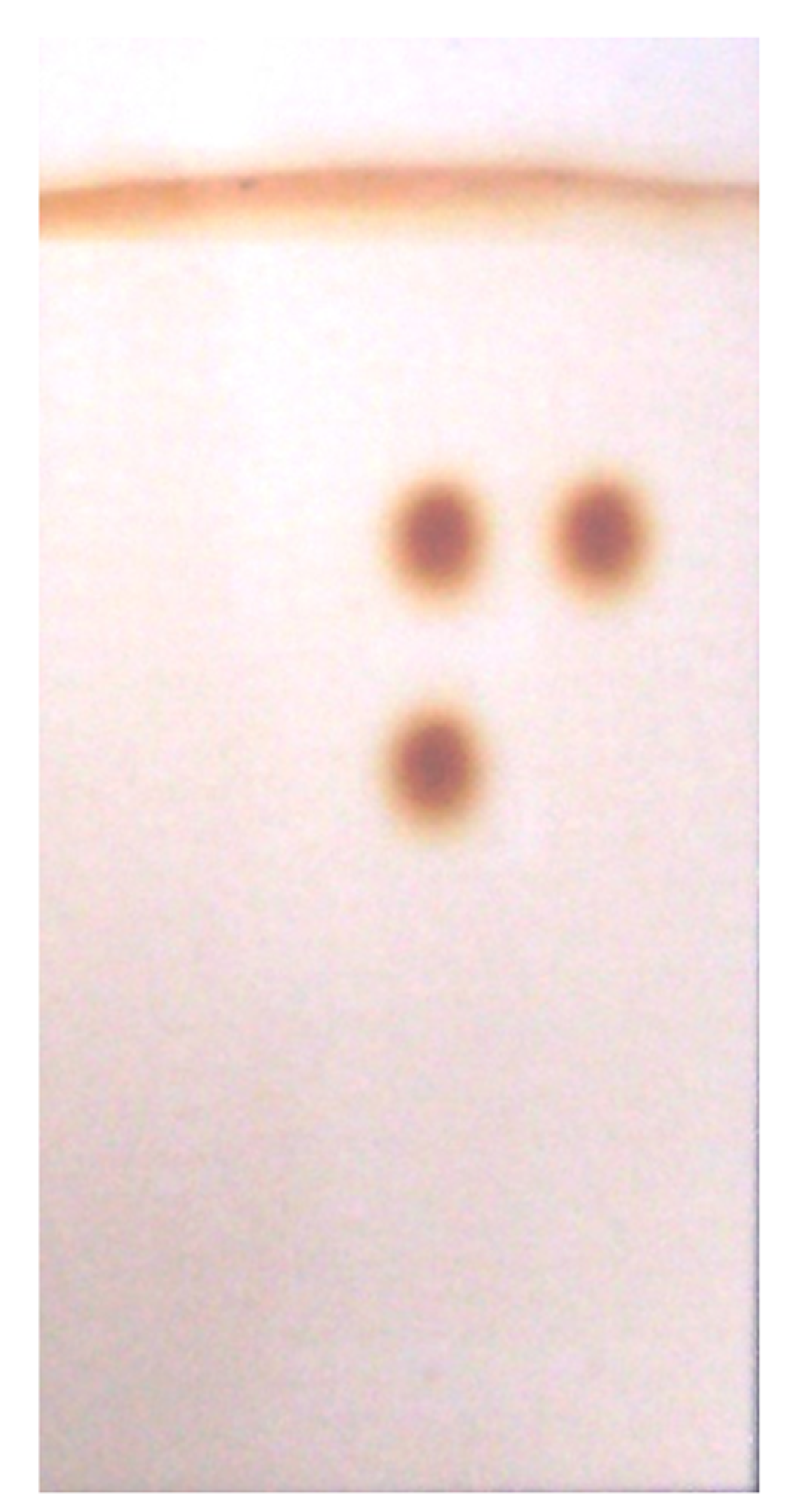
Enantioseparation of racemic Baclofen (left). Pure (S)-enantiomer (right).

Chiral thin-layer chromatography is a variant of liquid chromatography that is employed for the separation of enantiomers. It is necessary to use either

- a chiral stationary phase or
- a chiral additive in the mobile phase.

The chiral stationary phase can be prepared by mixing chirally pure reagents such as L-amino acid, or brucine, or a chiral ligand exchange reagent with silica gel slurry, or by impregnation of the TLC plate in the solution of a chiral reagent.

The principle can also be applied to chemically modify the stationary phase before making the plate via bonding of the chiral moieties of interest to the reactive groups of the layer material.

== See also ==
- Chiral column chromatography
