= High-performance thin-layer chromatography =

Advanced technique to separate non-volatile substances

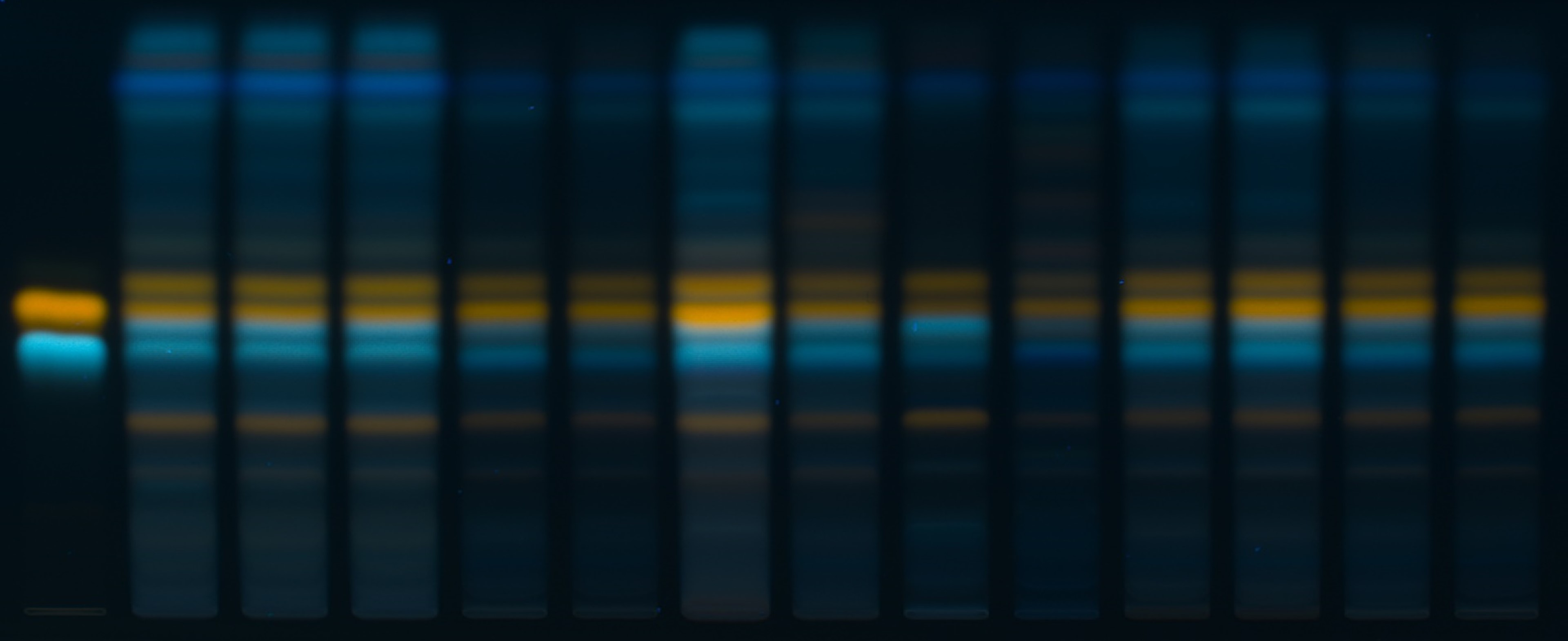
Picture of HPTLC plate to identify different substances within a sample.

High-performance thin-layer chromatography (HPTLC) serves as an extension of thin-layer chromatography (TLC), offering robustness, simplicity, speed, and efficiency in the quantitative analysis of compounds. This TLC-based analytical technique enhances compound resolution for quantitative analysis. Some of these improvements involve employing higher-quality TLC plates with finer particle sizes in the stationary phase, leading to improved resolution. Additionally, the separation can be further refined through repeated plate development using a multiple development device. As a result, HPTLC provides superior resolution and lower Limit of Detection (LODs).

== Instrumentation ==
Advantages of HPTLC

- Provides straightforward information about effects arising from individual compounds in complex or natural samples separated in parallel.
- Combines chromatographic separation with effect-directed detection using enzymatic or biological assays.
- Helps to select important compounds from a sample for further characterization using high-resolution mass spectrometry.
- Offers unique benefits such as super-hyphenation, minimum sample preparation requirements, detection of multi-modulating compounds, and distinguishing agonistic versus antagonistic effects.

=== Mode ===
HPTLC comprises three modes: linear mode, circular mode, and anticircular mode. Among these modes, the anticircular mode stands out as the fastest in theory and practice within the realm of HPTLC. This mode achieves separation by allowing the mobile phase to enter the plate layer precisely along an outer circular path, after which it flows toward the center at a nearly constant speed. This approach maximizes sample capacity while minimizing time, layer, and mobile phase consumption, making it the most cost-effective HPTLC technique. The narrow spot-path unique to anticircular HPTLC facilitates automated quantification. When compared to the linear and circular modes, the anticircular mode demonstrates superior separation and significantly heightened sensitivity, especially at higher Rf-values.

== Methodology ==
To begin HPTLC, a stationary phase has to be determined to separate different compounds within a mixture. Around 90% of all pharmaceutical separations are performed on normal phase silica gel; however, other stationary phases such as alumina can be used for samples with dissociating compounds and cellulose for ionic compounds. The reverse-phase HPTLC method (similar methodology to reverse-phase TLC) is used for compounds with high polarity. After the selection of the stationary phase, plates are generally washed with methanol and dried in an oven to remove excess solvent.

Selection for the mobile phase is one of the most important processes of HPTLC and follows a 'trial and error' pathway. However, the 'PRISMA' system stands as a guideline for finding the optimal mobile phase. The mobile phase is dependent on the absorptivity of the stationary phase and the composition of the compound of interest. The compound is first tested with solutions such as diethyl ether, ethanol, dichloromethane, chloroform for normal phase HPTLC, or solutions such as methanol, acetonitrile, and tetrahydrofuran for reverse phase HPTLC. The retardation factors (Rf) of the compounds with the selected solvent are then analyzed and the solvent that gives the largest Rf is chosen to be the mobile phase for the compound. Then, the mobile solvent strength is tested against hexane (for normal HPTLC) and water (for reverse-phase HPTLC) to determine the need for adjustment.

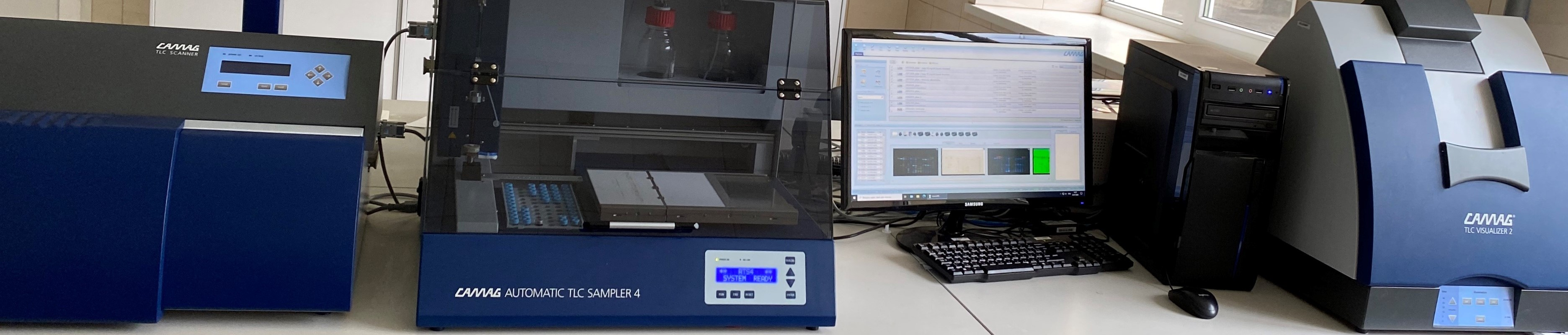
CAMAG HPTLC machine

Notable HPTLC devices such as the Linomat 5 and the Automatic TLC Sampler 4 (ATS 4) by CAMAG function very similarly by having the automated 'spray-on' sample application technique. This automated 'spray-on' technique is useful to overcome the uncertainty in droplet size and position when the sample is applied to the TLC plate by hand. Additionally, automation provides high resolution and narrow bands since the solvent evaporates immediately as the sample makes contact with the plate. One approach to automation has been the use of piezoelectric devices and inkjet printers for applying the sample. Alternatively, the Nanomat 4 and ATS 4 by CAMAG are manually operated where the sample is applied via spot application using a capillary pipette.

Upon chromatographic detection, HPTLC plates are usually developed in saturated twin-trough chambers with filter paper for optimal outcomes. However, flat-bottom chambers and horizontal-development chambers are also used for specific compounds. A general mechanism for the HPTLC device goes as follows. A fitted filter paper is placed in the rear trough of the chamber and the mobile phase is poured through the rear trough to ensure complete solvent absorption of the filter paper. The chamber is then tilted to ~45° so both troughs are equal in solvent volume and left alone to equilibrate for ~20 mins. Finally, the HPTLC plate is placed in the chamber to develop. Between each sample reading, the mobile phase and filter paper are changed to ensure the best outcomes.

The spot capacity (analogous to peak capacity in HPLC) can be increased by developing the plate with two different solvents, using two-dimensional chromatography. The procedure begins with development of a sample loaded plate with first solvent. After removing it, the plate is rotated 90° and developed with a second solvent.

== Applications ==
HPTLC finds extensive application in various fields, including pharmaceutical industries, clinical chemistry, forensic chemistry, biochemistry, cosmetology, food and drug analysis, environmental analysis, and more, owing to its numerous advantages. It distinguishes itself by being the only chromatographic method capable of presenting results as images and offers simplicity, cost-effectiveness, parallel analysis of samples, high sample capacity, rapid results, and the option for multiple detection methods.

Le Roux's research team assessed HPTLC for determining salbutamol serum levels in clinical trials and concluded that it is a suitable method for analyzing serum samples.

HPTLC has proven valuable in lichenology for analyzing and identifying lichen substances. Compared to standard TLC, the technique offers several advantages for screening lichen compounds: it allows twice as many samples to be run on one plate, requires significantly less solvent (4 mL per plate versus 250 mL), completes chromatographic separation in under 10 minutes per plate, and can detect substances at much lower concentrations. The method's increased sensitivity has enabled detection of previously unidentified lichen compounds and revealed greater chemical variation within lichen species. Since the early 1990s, HPTLC has been used as an improved alternative to standard TLC for routine screening of lichen substances, though proper plate drying is critical as the technique is more sensitive to atmospheric humidity than standard TLC.

HPTLC has also been used successfully in the separation of various lipid subclasses, with reproducible and promising results obtained for 20 different lipid subclasses. Numerous reports related to clinical medicine studies have been published in various journals. As a result, HPTLC is now strongly recommended for drug analysis in serum and other tissues.
