= Β-Cyclodextrin =

β-Cyclodextrin

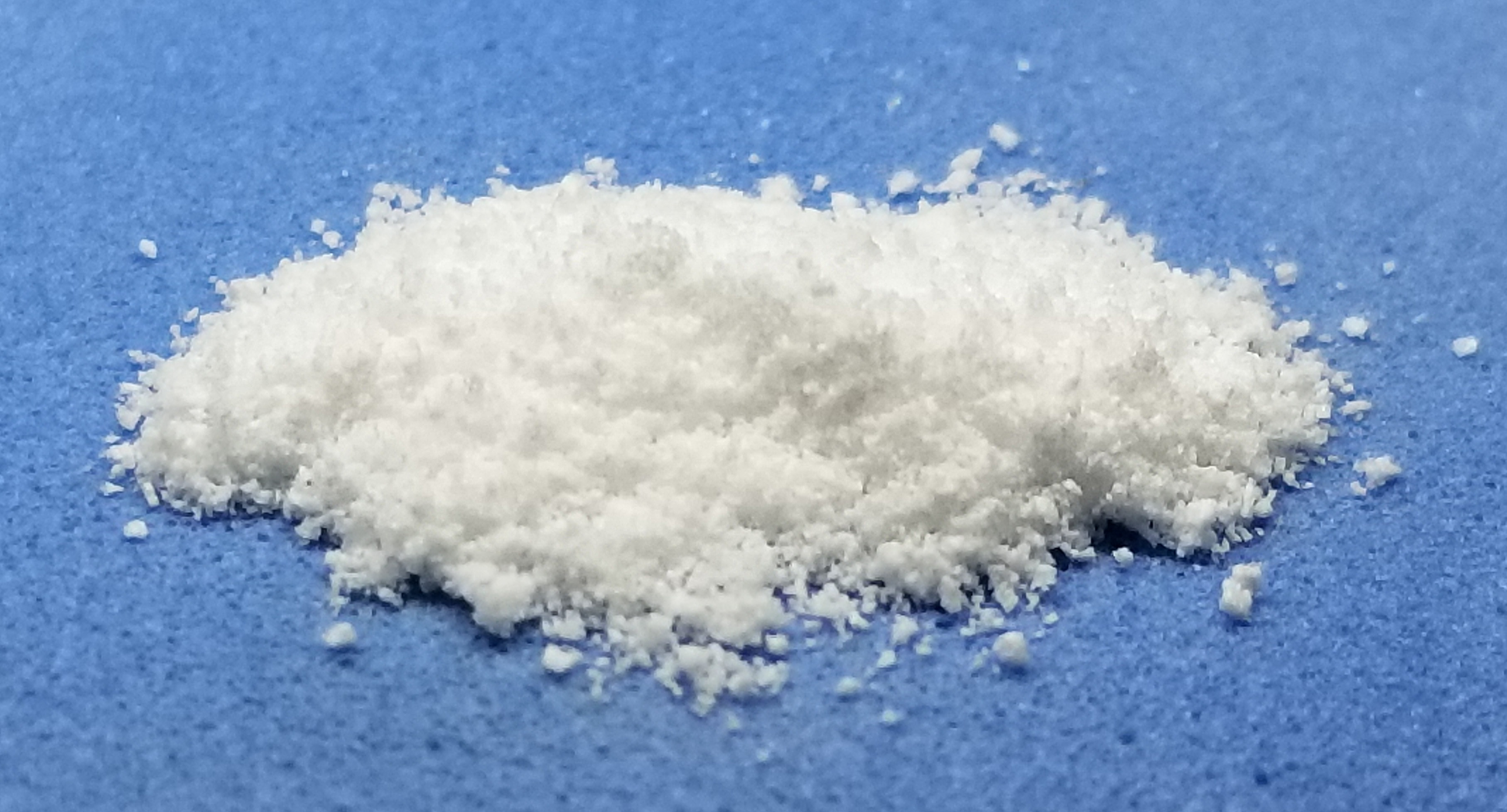

Names
- IUPAC name Cyclomaltoheptaose
- Systematic IUPAC name Cycloheptakis-(1→4)-α-D-glucopyranosyl
- Other names Cycloheptaamylose; Cycloheptadextrin; Cyclomaltoheptose β-Cycloamylose; Schardinger β-Dextrin; Betadex

Identifiers
CAS Number	7585-39-9 (hydrate)
3D model (JSmol)	Interactive image
ChEBI	CHEBI:495055
ChEMBL	ChEMBL415690
ChemSpider	10469496
DrugBank	DB03995
ECHA InfoCard	100.028.631
EC Number	233-007-4
E number	E459 (thickeners, ...)
KEGG	C13183
PubChem CID	444041
UNII	JV039JZZ3A (hydrate)
CompTox Dashboard (EPA)	DTXSID1020358
- InChI: InChI=1S/C42H70O35/c43-1-8-29-15(50)22(57)36(64-8)72-30-9(2-44)66-38(24(59)17(30)52)74-32-11(4-46)68-40(26(61)19(32)54)76-34-13(6-48)70-42(28(63)21(34)56)77-35-14(7-49)69-41(27(62)20(35)55)75-33-12(5-47)67-39(25(60)18(33)53)73-31-10(3-45)65-37(71-29)23(58)16(31)51/h8-63H,1-7H2/t8-,9-,10-,11-,12-,13-,14-,15-,16-,17-,18-,19-,20-,21-,22-,23-,24-,25-,26-,27-,28-,29-,30-,31-,32-,33-,34-,35-,36-,37-,38-,39-,40-,41-,42-/m1/s1 Key: WHGYBXFWUBPSRW-FOUAGVGXSA-N
- SMILES: C([C@@H]1[C@@H]2[C@@H]([C@H]([C@H](O1)O[C@@H]3[C@H](O[C@@H]([C@@H]([C@H]3O)O)O[C@@H]4[C@H](O[C@@H]([C@@H]([C@H]4O)O)O[C@@H]5[C@H](O[C@@H]([C@@H]([C@H]5O)O)O[C@@H]6[C@H](O[C@@H]([C@@H]([C@H]6O)O)O[C@@H]7[C@H](O[C@@H]([C@@H]([C@H]7O)O)O[C@@H]8[C@H](O[C@H](O2)[C@@H]([C@H]8O)O)CO)CO)CO)CO)CO)CO)O)O)O

Properties
Chemical formula	C_{42}H_{70}O_{35}
Molar mass	1134.987 g·mol^{−1}
Appearance	White solid
Melting point	501 °C (934 °F; 774 K) at fast heating rates, decomposition below 260 °C for conventional heating
Solubility in water	18.5 g/L
- Except where otherwise noted, data are given for materials in their standard state (at 25 °C [77 °F], 100 kPa). Infobox references

β-Cyclodextrin sometimes abbreviated as β-CD, is a heptasaccharide derived from glucose. The α- (alpha), β- (beta), and γ- (gamma) cyclodextrins correspond to six, seven, and eight glucose units, respectively. β-Cyclodextrin is the most used natural cyclodextrin in marketed medicines. The reason for this lies in the ease of its production and subsequent low price (more than 10,000 tons produced annually with an average bulk price of approximately 5 USD per kg).

== Structure ==
In β-cyclodextrin, the seven glucose subunits are linked end to end via α-1,4 linkages. The result has the shape of a tapered cylinder, with seven primary alcohols on one face and fourteen secondary alcohol groups on the other. The exterior surface of cyclodextrins is somewhat hydrophilic whereas the interior core is hydrophobic.

== Physical properties ==
β-Cyclodextrin exists as a white (colorless) powder or crystals. The density of its saturated hydrate crystal (βCD·12H_{2}O) is 1.46 g/cm^{3}. β-Cyclodextrin is moderately soluble in water and glycerin; well soluble in dimethyl sulfoxide, dimethylformamide, pyridine, HFIP, and ethylene glycol; and insoluble in ethanol and acetone. It has an optical rotation of [α]D/25 + 160° to + 164° (1 % solution).

== Applications ==
β-Cyclodextrin is widely used in medicine, pharmacy, food industry, textiles. Its molecules can accommodate various biomolecules and hence are also used as a complexing agent. Hydrophobic forms of β- CD have been used as sustained release drug carriers. In addition to improving the solubility of compounds, complexation with cyclodextrin has been used to improve the stability of many drugs by inclusion of the compound and protecting certain functional groups from degradation. β-Cyclodextrin is also beginning to be used in environmental chemistry. Its unique structure allows it to form inclusion complexes with various pollutants (primarily tested in aqueous environments) and decrease the concentration of the pollutant.

== Inclusion Complexes ==
β-Cyclodextrin can form inclusion complexes where molecules including organic pollutants, pesticides, pharmaceuticals, and hydrocarbons can be trapped within the cavity of the β-Cyclodextrin molecule through non-covalent bonds. This property of forming inclusion complexes can be utilized in removing pollutants from water.

β-Cyclodextrin can be modified through crosslinking β-cyclodextrin and linecaps to increase the materials, including the uptake of certain metals, that can be trapped within the molecules cavity.

Concerning drug delivery, cyclodextrin inclusion complexes typically open to release the drug when exposed to a larger volume such as the blood or digestive fluid in the stomach _{.} This is due to Le Chatelier's Principle. Another factor affecting release of drugs from cyclodextrin inclusion complexes is competition from other molecules. Bile salts in the intestinal track often compete for the hydrophobic core of cyclodextrins causing the drug to be released out, and absorbed through the small intestines.

== Derivatives ==
β-cyclodextrin has relatively low solubility in water, and hence industry uses its derivatives, such as 2-hydroxypropyl-β-cyclodextrin (HPbCD), randomly methylated β-cyclodextrin (RAMEB), and β-cyclodextrin sulfobutyl ether sodium salt (SBEbCD).

== History ==
β-cyclodextrin (along with α-cyclodextrin) was first discovered in 1891 by Antoine Villers who studied enzymatic degradation of potato starch in bacteria. Villers first gave them the name “cellulosines” due to their similar properties to cellulose. Later Franz Schardinger renamed these two compounds dextrins leading to the modern name cyclodextrin. Karl Freudenberg and his co-workers, in 1939, published a full description of the two separated compounds, and it wasn't until 1954 when there was a focus on separating and purifying cyclodextrins naturally and their guest inclusion complexes by Friedrich Cramer. In 1976, the first pharmaceutical product containing cyclodextrins, prostaglandin E2/β-Cyclodextrin (Prostarmon E^{TM} sublingual tablets) were marketed in Japan. In 1988, piroxicam/βCD (Brexin tablets) were marketed for the first time in Europe. Piroxicam/βCD oral medications have been shown to decrease acute gastroduodenal lesions/injuries because the βCD solubilizes the harsh Piroxicam drug and prevents it from crashing out.

== See also ==
- α-Cyclodextrin
- γ-Cyclodextrin
