= Cyclomaltodextrin glucanotransferase =

Class of enzymes

cyclomaltodextrin glucanotransferase
- CGTase ribbon diagram

Identifiers
- EC no.: 2.4.1.19
- CAS no.: 9030-09-5

Databases
- BRENDA: enzyme data
- ExPASy: NiceZyme view
- KEGG: enzyme entry
- MetaCyc: metabolic pathway
- Rhea: reactions
- PDB structures: RCSB PDB PDBe PDBsum
- Gene Ontology: AmiGO / QuickGO
Search
- PMC: articles
- PubMed: articles
- NCBI: proteins

In enzymology, a cyclomaltodextrin glucanotransferase (also cyclodextrin glycosyl transferase or CGTase for short) (EC 2.4.1.19) is an enzyme that catalyzes the chemical reaction of cyclizing part of a 1,4-alpha-D-glucan molecule through the formation of a 1,4-alpha-D-glucosidic bond. They are bacterial enzymes belonging to the same family of the α-amylase specifically known as glycosyl-hydrolase family 13. This peculiar enzyme is capable of catalyzing more than one reaction with the most important being the synthesis of non-reducing cyclic dextrins known as cyclodextrins starting from starch, amylose, and other polysaccharides.

CGTase is an enzyme common to many bacterial species, in particular of the Bacillus genus (e.g. B. circulans, B. macerans and B. stearothermophilus) and Brevibacillus brevis.

This enzyme belongs to the family of glycosyltransferases, specifically the hexosyltransferases. The systematic name of this enzyme class is 1,4-alpha-D-glucan 4-alpha-D-(1,4-alpha-D-glucano)-transferase (cyclizing). Other names in common use include Bacillus macerans amylase, cyclodextrin glucanotransferase, alpha-cyclodextrin glucanotransferase, alpha-cyclodextrin glycosyltransferase, beta-cyclodextrin glucanotransferase, beta-cyclodextrin glycosyltransferase, gamma-cyclodextrin glycosyltransferase, cyclodextrin glycosyltransferase, cyclomaltodextrin glucotransferase, cyclomaltodextrin glycosyltransferase, konchizaimu, alpha-1,4-glucan 4-glycosyltransferase, cyclizing, BMA, CGTase, and neutral-cyclodextrin glycosyltransferase.

== Catalytic activities ==
All of the CGTases can catalyze up to four reactions: cyclization, coupling, disproportionation and hydrolysis. All these activities share the same catalytic mechanism which is common to all glycosyl-hydrolases.

Cyclization is the process through which a linear polysaccharidic chain is cleaved and the two ends of the cleaved fragment are joined to produce a circular dextrin (cyclodextrin or CD): on the basis of the number of sugar residues this circular product is made of three main types of cyclodextrins can be distinguished, α-CD with six residues, β-CD with seven residues and γ-CD with eight residues.

The coupling reaction can be easily described as the reverse process of cyclization: the enzyme cleaves a cyclodextrin to produce a linear dextrin which is subsequently joined to a linear oligosaccharide.

Disproportionation is very similar to coupling, but the cleaved dextrin is not a cyclodextrin, but a linear oligosaccharide that is then joined to a second oligosaccharide.

CGTase also has a weak hydrolyzing activity which consists in cleaving the longer polysaccharidic chains into shorter fragments.

== Structural studies ==
As of late 2007, 47 structures have been solved for this class of enzymes, with PDB accession codes PDB: 1A47, PDB: 1CDG, PDB: 1CGT, PDB: 1CGU, PDB: 1CGV, PDB: 1CGW, PDB: 1CGX, PDB: 1CGY, PDB: 1CIU, PDB: 1CXE, PDB: 1CXF, PDB: 1CXH, PDB: 1CXI, PDB: 1CXK, PDB: 1CXL, PDB: 1CYG, PDB: 1D3C, PDB: 1D7F, PDB: 1DED, PDB: 1DTU, PDB: 1EO5, PDB: 1EO7, PDB: 1I75, PDB: 1KCK, PDB: 1KCL, PDB: 1OT1, PDB: 1OT2, PDB: 1PAM, PDB: 1PEZ, PDB: 1PJ9, PDB: 1TCM, PDB: 1UKQ, PDB: 1UKS, PDB: 1UKT, PDB: 1V3J, PDB: 1V3K, PDB: 1V3L, PDB: 1V3M, PDB: 2CXG, PDB: 2DIJ, PDB: 3CGT, PDB: 4CGT, PDB: 5CGT, PDB: 6CGT, PDB: 7CGT, PDB: 8CGT, and PDB: 9CGT.
