= Cyclodextrin =

Cyclic oligosaccharide with 6 to 8 glucose units

Chemical structure of the three main types of cyclodextrins.

Cyclodextrins are a family of cyclic oligosaccharides, consisting of a macrocyclic ring of glucose subunits joined by α-1,4 glycosidic bonds. Cyclodextrins are produced from starch by enzymatic conversion. They are used in food, pharmaceutical, drug delivery, and chemical industries, as well as agriculture and environmental engineering.

Cyclodextrins are composed of 5 or more α-D-glucopyranoside units linked 1 → 4, as in amylose (a fragment of starch). Typical cyclodextrins contain a number of glucose monomers ranging from six to eight units in a ring, creating a cone shape:

- α (alpha)-cyclodextrin: 6 glucose subunits
- β (beta)-cyclodextrin: 7 glucose subunits
- γ (gamma)-cyclodextrin: 8 glucose subunits

The largest well-characterized cyclodextrin contains 32 1,4-anhydroglucopyranoside units. Poorly-characterized mixtures, containing at least 150-membered cyclic oligosaccharides are also known.

== Applications ==
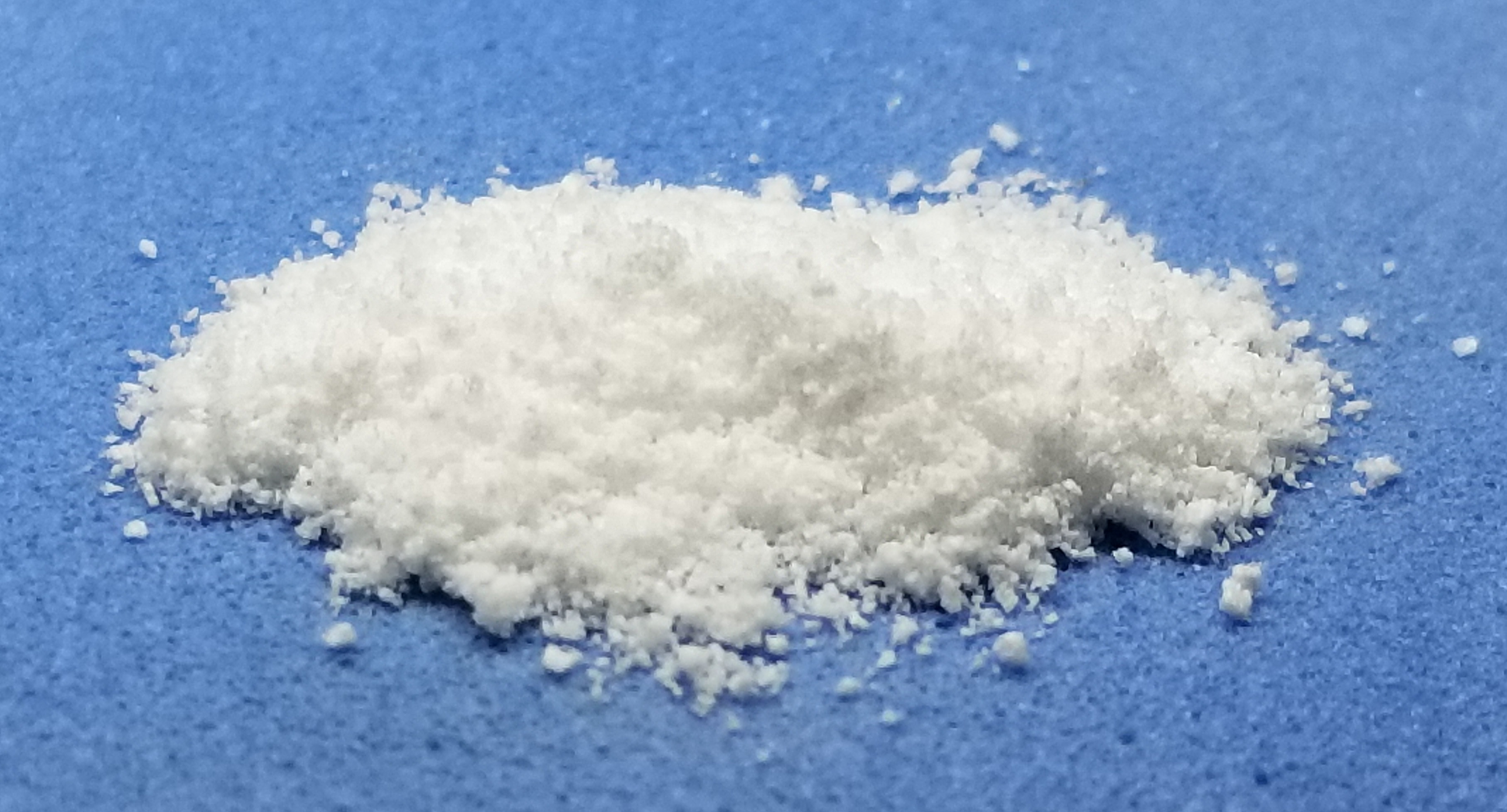
β-Cyclodextrin

=== Drug delivery ===
Cyclodextrins are ingredients in more than 30 different approved medicines. With a hydrophobic interior and hydrophilic exterior, cyclodextrins form complexes with hydrophobic compounds. Alpha-, beta-, and gamma-cyclodextrin are all generally recognized as safe by the U.S. FDA. They have been applied for delivery of a variety of drugs, including hydrocortisone, prostaglandin, nitroglycerin, itraconazole, chloramphenicol. The cyclodextrin confers solubility and stability to these drugs. The inclusion compounds of cyclodextrins with hydrophobic molecules are able to penetrate body tissues, these can be used to release biologically active compounds under specific conditions. In most cases the mechanism of controlled degradation of such complexes is based on pH change of water solutions, leading to the loss of hydrogen or ionic bonds between the host and the guest molecules. Alternative means for the disruption of the complexes take advantage of heating or action of enzymes able to cleave α-1,4 linkages between glucose monomers. Cyclodextrins were also shown to enhance mucosal penetration of drugs.

=== Chromatography ===
β-cyclodextrins are used to produce stationary phase media for HPLC separations.

=== Other ===
Cyclodextrins bind fragrances. Such devices are capable of releasing fragrances when heated, such as by ironing, body heat, or a dryer. A common application is a typical 'dryer sheet'. They are also the main ingredient in Febreze, which claims that the β-cyclodextrins "trap" odor-causing compounds, thereby reducing the odor.

Cyclodextrins are also used to produce alcohol powder by encapsulating ethanol. The powder produces an alcoholic beverage when mixed with water, or can also be taken in a pill. The approval of powdered alcohol by the FDA in 2014 was met with wide-spread bans and backlash in the United States.

== Structure ==
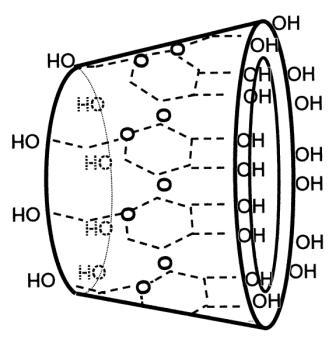
γ-CD toroid structure showing spatial arrangement.

Typical cyclodextrins are constituted by 6-8 glucopyranoside units. These subunits are linked by 1,4 glycosidic bonds. The cyclodextrins have toroidal shapes, with the larger and the smaller openings of the toroid exposing to the solvent secondary and primary hydroxyl groups respectively. Because of this arrangement, the interior of the toroids is considerably less hydrophilic than the aqueous environment and thus able to host hydrophobic molecules. In contrast, the exterior is sufficiently hydrophilic to impart cyclodextrins (or their complexes) water solubility. They are not soluble in typical organic solvents.

== Synthesis ==
Cyclodextrins are prepared by enzymatic treatment of starch. Commonly cyclodextrin glycosyltransferase (CGTase) is employed along with α-amylase. First starch is liquified either by heat treatment or using α-amylase, then CGTase is added for the enzymatic conversion. CGTases produce mixtures of cyclodextrins, thus the product of the conversion results in a mixture of the three main types of cyclic molecules, in ratios that are strictly dependent on the enzyme used: each CGTase has its own characteristic α:β:γ synthesis ratio. Purification of the three types of cyclodextrins takes advantage of the different water solubility of the molecules: β-CD which is poorly water-soluble (18.5 g/L or 16.3 mM at 25 °C) can be easily retrieved through crystallization while the more soluble α- and γ-CDs (145 and 232 g/L respectively) are usually purified by means of expensive and time consuming chromatography techniques. As an alternative a "complexing agent" can be added during the enzymatic conversion step: such agents (usually organic solvents like toluene, acetone or ethanol) form a complex with the desired cyclodextrin which subsequently precipitates. The complex formation drives the conversion of starch towards the synthesis of the precipitated cyclodextrin, thus enriching its content in the final mixture of products. Some researchers have developed dedicated processes that can produce alpha-, beta- or gamma-cyclodextrin specifically. This is very valuable especially for the food industry, as only alpha- and gamma-cyclodextrin can be consumed without a daily intake limit.

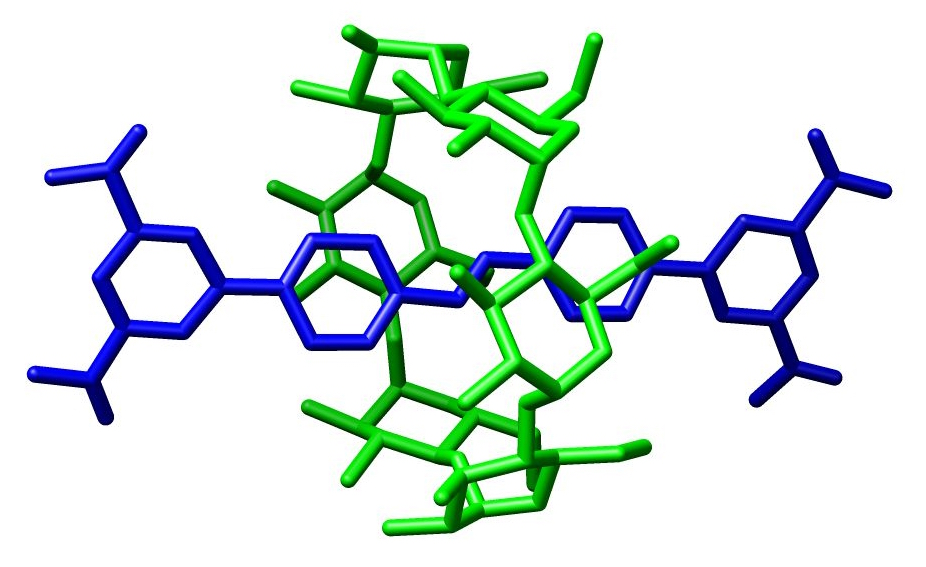
Crystal structure of a rotaxane with an α-cyclodextrin macrocycle.

=== Derivatives ===
Interest in cyclodextrins is enhanced because their host–guest behavior can be manipulated by chemical modification of the hydroxyl groups. O-Methylation and acetylation are typical conversions. Propylene oxide gives hydroxypropylated derivatives. The primary alcohols can be tosylated. The degree of derivatization is an adjustable, i.e. full methylation vs partial.

Both β-cyclodextrin and methyl-β-cyclodextrin (MβCD) remove cholesterol from cultured cells. The methylated form MβCD was found to be more efficient than β-cyclodextrin. The water-soluble MβCD is known to form soluble inclusion complexes with cholesterol, thereby enhancing its solubility in aqueous solution. MβCD is employed for the preparation of cholesterol-free products: the bulky and hydrophobic cholesterol molecule is easily lodged inside cyclodextrin rings. MβCD is also employed in research to disrupt lipid rafts by removing cholesterol from membranes.

Due to the covalent attachment of thiol groups to cyclodextrins high mucoadhesive properties can be introduced as these thiolated oligomers (thiomers) are capable of forming disulfide bonds with cysteine-rich subdomains of mucus glycoproteins. The gastrointestinal and ocular residence time of thiolated cyclodextrins is therefore substantially prolonged. Furthermore, thiolated cyclodextrins are actively taken up by target cells releasing their payload into the cytoplasma. The cellular uptake of various model drugs, for instance, was up to 20-fold improved by using thiolated α-cyclodextrin as carrier system.

== Research ==
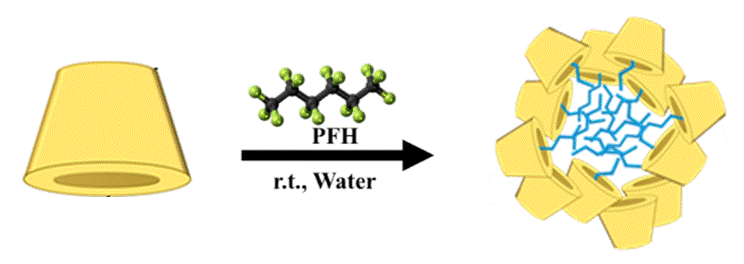
Synthesis of acoustically active nanoparticles for 'Nanoparticle Mediated Histotripsy'.

In supramolecular chemistry, cyclodextrins are precursors to mechanically interlocked molecular architectures, such as rotaxanes and catenanes. Illustrative, α-cyclodextrin form second-sphere coordination complex with tetrabromoaurate anion ([AuBr4]-).

β-Cyclodextrin complexes with certain carotenoid food colorants have been shown to intensify color, increase water solubility and improve light stability.

Complexes formed between β-cyclodextrin and adamantane derivatives have been used to make self-healing materials, such as hydrogels and low-friction surfaces.

Using the host-guest interaction between β-Cyclodextrin and Perfluorohexane, acoustically active nanoparticles were created. These nanoparticles were combined with histotripsy, leading to the development of Nanoparticle-Mediated Histotripsy (NMH). NMH addresses limitations of traditional histotripsy, such as non-selectivity and the requirement for high pressure. This promising new method has potential applications in cell ablation for various purposes, including cancer treatment.

== History ==
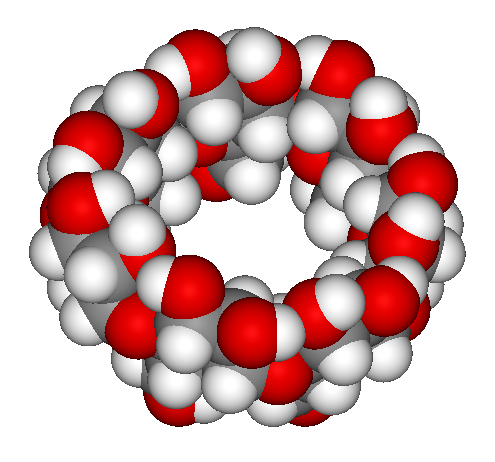
Space filling model of β-cyclodextrin.

Cyclodextrins were called "cellulosine" when first described by A. Villiers in 1891. Soon after, F. Schardinger identified the three naturally occurring cyclodextrins: α, β, and γ, referred to as "Schardinger sugars". For 25 years, between 1911 and 1935, Hans Pringsheim in Germany was the leading researcher in this area, demonstrating that cyclodextrins formed stable aqueous complexes with many other chemicals. By the mid-1970s, each of the natural cyclodextrins had been structurally and chemically characterized and many more complexes had been studied. Since the 1970s, extensive work has been conducted by Szejtli and others exploring encapsulation by cyclodextrins and their derivatives for industrial and pharmacologic applications. Among the processes used for complexation, the kneading process seems to be one of the best.

== Safety ==
Cyclodextrins are of wide interest in part because they appear nontoxic in animal studies. The LD50 (oral, rats) is on the order of grams per kilogram. Nevertheless, attempts to use β-cyclodextrin for the prevention of atherosclerosis, age-related lipofuscin accumulation and obesity encounter an obstacle in the form of damage to the auditory nerve and nephrotoxic effect.
