= 1,3-Propane sultone =

- 1,3-Propane sultone

Names
- Preferred IUPAC name 1,2λ^{6}-Oxathiolane-2,2-dione
- Other names γ-Propane sultone; 1,2-Oxathiolane, 2,2-dioxide; 3-Hydroxyl-1-propane sulfonic acid sulfone; 1-Propane sulfonic acid-3-hydroxyl-γ-sultone; Oxathiolane 2,2-dioxide

Identifiers
CAS Number	1120-71-4
3D model (JSmol)	Interactive image
ChemSpider	13626
ECHA InfoCard	100.013.017
PubChem CID	14264
UNII	L6NTK7VJX9
CompTox Dashboard (EPA)	DTXSID8021195
- InChI: InChI=1S/C3H6O3S/c4-7(5)3-1-2-6-7/h1-3H2 Key: FSSPGSAQUIYDCN-UHFFFAOYSA-N; InChI=1/C3H6O3S/c4-7(5)3-1-2-6-7/h1-3H2 Key: FSSPGSAQUIYDCN-UHFFFAOYAH
- SMILES: C1COS(=O)(=O)C1

Properties
Chemical formula	C_{3}H_{6}O_{3}S
Molar mass	122.14 g·mol^{−1}
Appearance	White crystalline solid; colorless liquid above 31 °C
Density	1.392 g/cm^{3} at 40 °C
Melting point	31 °C (88 °F; 304 K)
Boiling point	112 °C (234 °F; 385 K) at 1.4 mm Hg
Solubility in water	10% (20°C)

Hazards
Flash point	158 °C (316 °F; 431 K)
- NIOSH (US health exposure limits)
PEL (Permissible)	none
REL (Recommended)	Ca
IDLH (Immediate danger)	Ca [N.D.]
Safety data sheet (SDS)	NIH.gov
- Except where otherwise noted, data are given for materials in their standard state (at 25 °C [77 °F], 100 kPa). verify (what is ?) Infobox references

1,3-Propane sultone is the organosulfur compound with the formula (CH_{2})_{3}SO_{3}. It is a cyclic sulfonate ester, a class of compounds called sultones. It is a readily melting colorless solid.

== Synthesis ==
It may be prepared by the acid catalyzed reaction of allyl alcohol and sodium bisulfite.

== Reactions ==
1,3-propane sultone is an activated ester and is susceptible to nucleophilic attack. It hydrolyzes to the 3-hydroxypropylsulfonic acid.

It has been used in the synthesis of specialist surfactants, such as CHAPS detergent.

== Safety ==
Typical of activated esters, 1,3-propane sultone is an alkylating agent. 1,3-Propane sultone is toxic, carcinogenic, mutagenic, and teratogenic.

== See also ==
- 1,4-Butane sultone
- Dimethyl sulfate
- Vinylsulfonic acid
- Isethionic acid
- Sulfolane
