= Amperometry =

Electroanalytic technique

Amperometry in chemistry is the detection of ions in a solution based on electric current or changes in electric current.

Amperometry is used in electrophysiology to study vesicle release events using a carbon fiber electrode. Unlike patch clamp techniques, the electrode used for amperometry is not inserted into or attached to the cell but brought nearby of the cell. The measurements from the electrode originate from an oxidizing reaction of a vesicle cargo released into the medium. Another technique used to measure vesicle release is capacitive measurements.

It is the electric current measured between a pair of electrodes. The measured current is directly proportional to the concentration of the analyte. Example: Blood glucose monitor

Carbon is used as a working electrode which is coated with mediator and glucose oxidase. Ag/AgCl is used as the reference electrode. The enzyme oxidase catalyzes the reaction of glucose with oxygen. Hydrogen peroxide concentration is measured by oxidation which occurs at +0.6V.

$H_2O_2 \longrightarrow O_2 + 2H^+ + 2e^-$

Current is directly proportional to H_{2}O_{2} concentration this in turn is directly proportional to glucose concentration. If O_{2} is low, complete conversion is inhibited. Hence mediator ferrocene is introduced. Now, current is directly proportional to the concentration of ferrocene which in turn is directly proportional to glucose concentration.

== History ==
Electrochemical or amperometric detection as it was first used in ion chromatography was single-potential or DC amperometry, useful for certain electrochemically active ions such as cyanide, sulfite, and iodide. The development of pulsed amperometric detection (PAD) for analytes that fouled electrode surfaces when detected eventually helped create a new category of ion chromatography for the determination of carbohydrates. Another advancement, known as integrated amperometry, has increased the sensitivity for other electrochemically active species, such as amines and many compounds that contain reduced sulfur groups, that are sometimes weakly detected by PAD.

It was established that neurotransmitters could be electrochemically detected by placing a carbon electrode into tissue and recording the current from oxidizing neurotransmitters. One of the first measurements was made using an implanted carbon fiber electrode in the neostriatum of rats. Further work was done in chromaffin cells to investigate catecholamine release from large dense core vesicles.

== Detection methods ==
=== Single-potential amperometry ===
Any analyte that can be oxidized or reduced is a candidate for amperometric detection. The simplest form of amperometric detection is single-potential, or direct current (DC), amperometry. A voltage (potential) is applied between two electrodes positioned in the column effluent. The measured current changes as an electroactive analyte is oxidized at the anode or reduced at the cathode. Single-potential amperometry has been used to detect weak acid anions, such as cyanide and sulfide, which are problematic by conductometric methods. Another, possibly more important advantage of amperometry over other detection methods for these and other ions, such as iodide, sulfite, and hydrazine, is specificity. The applied potential can be adjusted to maximize the response for the analyte of interest while minimizing the response for interfering analytes

=== Pulsed amperometry (pulsed amperometric detection, PAD) ===
An extension of single-potential amperometry is pulsed amperometry, most commonly used for analytes that tend to foul electrodes. Analytes that foul electrodes reduce the signal with each analysis and necessitate cleaning of the electrode. In pulsed amperometric detection (PAD), a working potential is applied for a short time (usually a few hundred milliseconds), followed by higher or lower potentials that are used for cleaning the electrode. The current is measured only while the working potential is applied, then sequential current measurements are processed by the detector to produce a smooth output. PAD is most often used for detection of carbohydrates after an anion exchange separation, but further development of related techniques show promise for amines, reduced sulfur species, and other electroactive compounds.

== Principle ==
In order to record vesicle fusion, a carbon fiber electrode is brought close to the cell. The electrode is held at a positive potential, and when the cargo from a fused vesicle is near the electrode, oxidation of the cargo transfers electrons to the electrode. This causes a spike, the size of which can be used to estimate the number of vesicles, and the frequency gives information about the release probability.
